= Anatolian rug =

Term commonly used to denote rugs woven in Anatolia

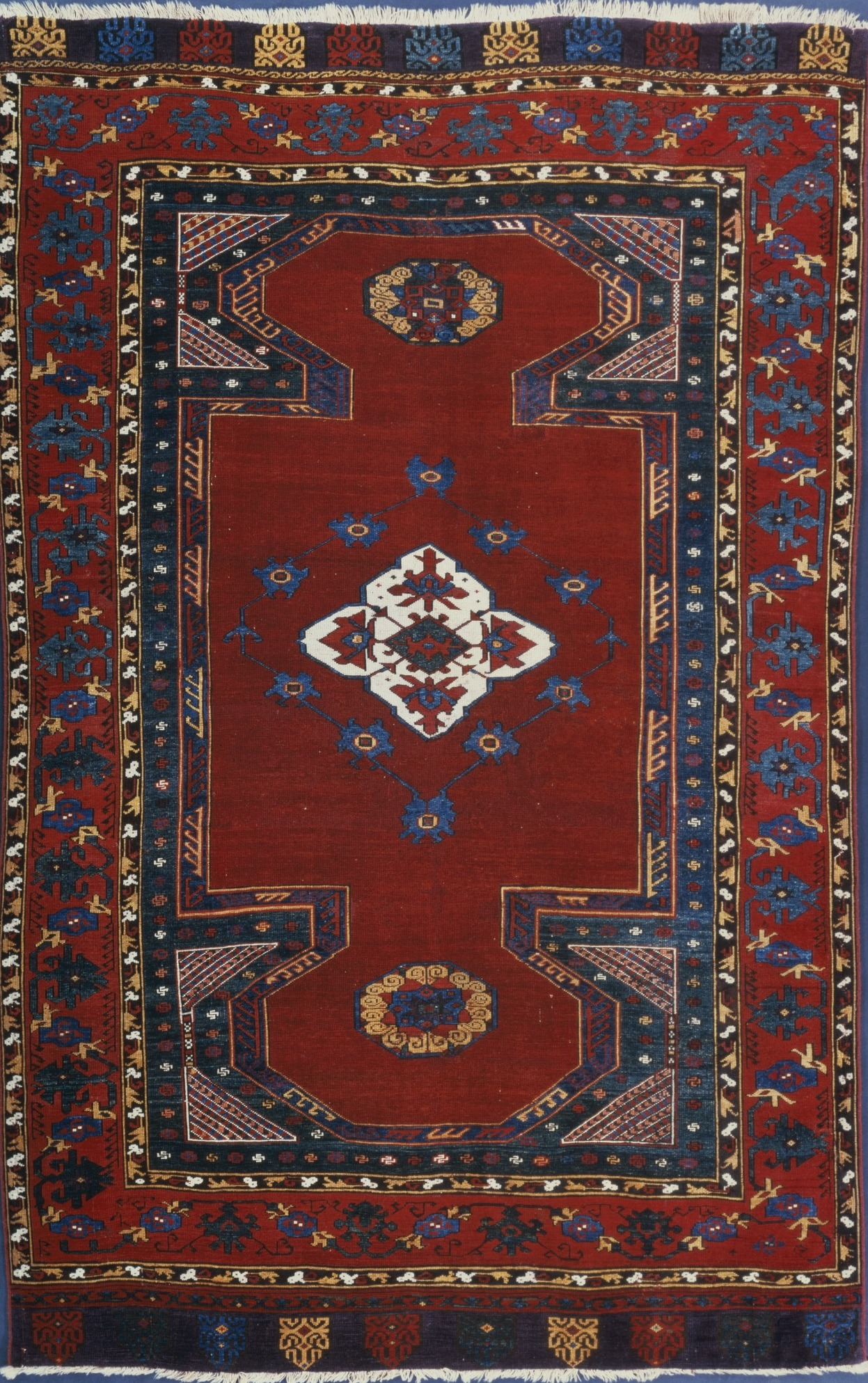
Anatolian double-niche rug, Konya region, circa 1750–1800. LACMA M.2004.32

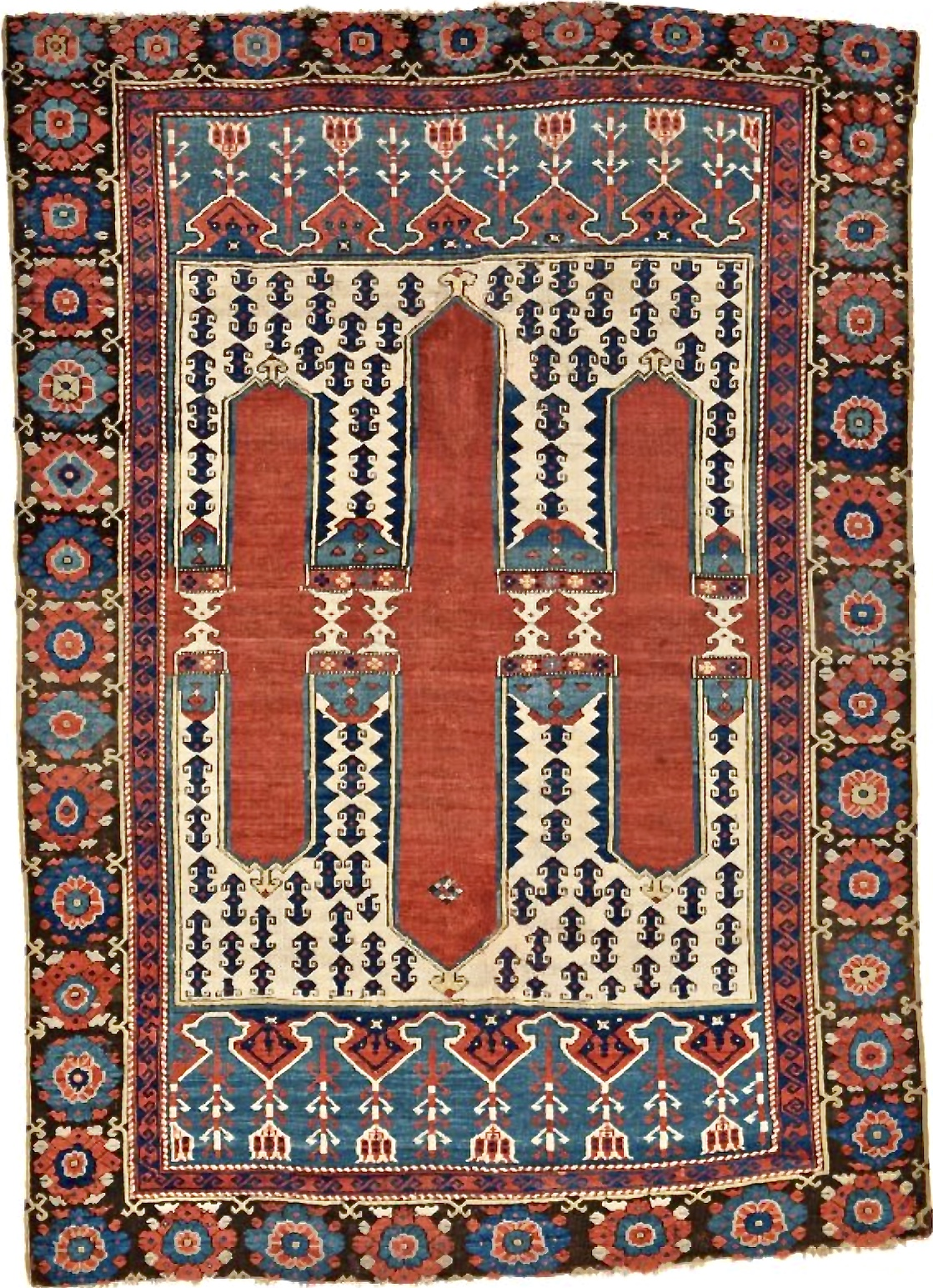
Bergama rug, west Anatolia, first half of 18th century.

Anatolian rug or Turkish carpet (Turkish: Türk Halısı) is a term of convenience, commonly used today to denote rugs and carpets woven in Anatolia and its adjacent regions. Geographically, its area of production can be compared to the territories which were historically dominated by the Ottoman Empire. It denotes a knotted, pile-woven floor or wall covering which is produced for home use, local sale, and export, and religious purpose. Together with the flat-woven kilim, Anatolian rugs represent an essential part of the regional culture, which is officially understood as the Culture of Turkey today, and derives from the ethnic, religious and cultural pluralism of one of the most ancient centres of human civilisation.

Rug weaving represents a traditional craft dating back to prehistoric times. Rugs were woven much earlier than even the oldest surviving rugs like the Pazyryk rug would suggest. During its long history, the art and craft of the woven carpet has absorbed and integrated different cultural traditions. Traces of Byzantine design can be observed in Anatolian rugs; Turkic peoples migrating from Central Asia, as well as Armenian people, and other Caucasian, as well as Kurdish tribes either living in, or migrating to Anatolia at different times in history contributed their traditional motifs and ornaments. The arrival of Islam and the development of the Islamic art has profoundly influenced the Anatolian rug design. Its ornaments and patterns thus reflect the political history and social diversity of the area. Since rug export was so popular within Iran, the cultural motives and display on the Anatolian rugs vary.

Within the group of oriental carpets, the Anatolian rug is distinguished by particular characteristics of its dyes and colours, motifs, textures and techniques. Examples range in size from small pillows (yastik) to large, room-sized carpets. The earliest surviving examples of Anatolian rugs known today date from the thirteenth century. Distinct types of rugs have been woven ever since in court manufactures and provincial workshops, village homes, tribal settlements, or in the nomad's tent. Rugs were simultaneously produced at all different levels of society, mainly using sheep wool, cotton and natural dyes. Anatolian rugs are most often tied with symmetrical knots, which were so widely used in the area that Western rug dealers in the early 20th century adopted the term "Turkish" or "Ghiordes" knot for the technique. From the 1870s onwards, the Ottoman court manufactures also produced silk-piled rugs, sometimes with inwoven threads of gold or silver, but the traditional material of the majority of Anatolian rugs was hand-spun, naturally dyed wool.

In Europe, Anatolian rugs were frequently depicted in Renaissance paintings, often in a context of dignity, prestige and luxury. Political contacts and trade intensified between Western Europe and the Islamic world after the 13th century AD. When direct trade was established with the Ottoman Empire during the 14th century, all kinds of carpets were at first indiscriminately given the trade name of "Turkish" carpets, regardless of their actual place of manufacture. Since the late nineteenth century, oriental rugs have been subject to art, historic, and scientific interest in the Western world. The richness and cultural diversity of rug weaving were gradually better understood. More recently, also flat woven carpets (Kilim, Soumak, Cicim, Zili) have attracted the interest of collectors and scientists.

The art and craft of the Anatolian rug underwent serious changes by the introduction of synthetic dyes from the last third of the 19th century onwards. The mass production of cheap rugs designed for commercial success had brought the ancient tradition close to extinction. In the late twentieth century, projects like the DOBAG Carpet Initiative have successfully revived the tradition of Anatolian rug weaving using hand-spun, naturally dyed wool and traditional designs

== History ==
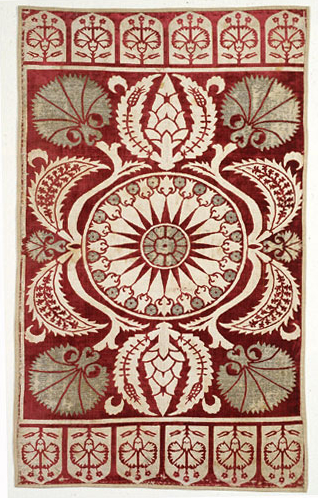
17th-century Ottoman velvet cushion cover, with stylized carnation motifs. Floral motifs were common in Ottoman art.

The origin of carpet weaving remains unknown, as carpets are subject to use, wear, and destruction by insects and rodents. Controversy arose over the accuracy of the claim that the oldest records of flat woven kilims come from the Çatalhöyük excavations, dated to circa 7000 BC. The excavators' report remained unconfirmed, as it states that the wall paintings depicting kilim motifs had disintegrated shortly after their exposure.

The history of rug weaving in Anatolia must be understood in the context of the country's political and social history. Anatolia was home to ancient civilizations, such as the Hittites, the Phrygians, the Assyrians, the Ancient Persians, the Armenians, the Ancient Greeks, and the Byzantine Empire. Rug weaving is assumed to already exist in Anatolia during this time, however there are no examples of pre-Turkic migration rugs in Anatolia. In 1071 AD, the Seljuq Alp Arslan defeated the Roman Emperor Romanos IV Diogenes at Manzikert. This is regarded as the beginning of the ascendancy of the Seljuq Turks.

=== Seljuq rugs: Travelers' reports and the Konya fragments ===
In the early fourteenth century, Marco Polo wrote in the account of his travels:

...In Turcomania there are three classes of people. First, there are the Turcomans; these are worshippers of Mahommet, a rude people with an uncouth language of their own. They dwell among mountains and downs where they find good pasture, for their occupation is cattle-keeping. Excellent horses, known as Turquans, are reared in their country, and also very valuable mules. The other two classes are the Armenians and the Greeks, who live mixt with the former in the towns and villages, occupying themselves with trade and handicrafts. They weave the finest and handsomest carpets in the world, and also a great quantity of fine and rich silks of cramoisy and other colours, and plenty of other stuffs.

Coming from Persia, Polo travelled from Sivas to Kayseri. Abu'l-Fida, citing Ibn Sa'id al-Maghribi refers to rug export from Anatolian cities in the late 13th century: "That's where Turkoman carpets are made, which are exported to all other countries". He and the Moroccan merchant Ibn Battuta mention Aksaray as a major rug weaving center in the early-to-mid-14th century.

The earliest surviving woven rugs were found in Konya, Beyşehir and Fostat, and were dated to the 13th century. These carpets from the Anatolian Seljuq Period (1243–1302) are regarded as the first group of Anatolian rugs. Eight fragments were found in 1905 by F.R. Martin in the Alaeddin Mosque in Konya, four in the Eşrefoğlu Mosque in Beyşehir in Konya province by R.M. Riefstahl in 1925. More fragments were found in Fostat, today a suburb of the city of Cairo.

Judging by their original size (Riefstahl reports a carpet up to 6 m long), the Konya carpets must have been produced in town manufactories, as looms of this size can hardly have been set up in a nomadic or village home. Where exactly these carpets were woven is unknown. The field patterns of the Konya rugs are mostly geometric, and small in relation to the carpet size. Similar patterns are arranged in diagonal rows: Hexagons with plain, or hooked outlines; squares filled with stars, with interposed kufic-like ornaments; hexagons in diamonds composed of rhomboids filled with stylized flowers and leaves. Their main borders often contain kufic ornaments. The corners are not "resolved", which means that the border design is cut off, and does not continue diagonally around the corners. The colours (blue, red, green, to a lesser extent also white, brown, yellow) are subdued, frequently two shades of the same colour are opposed to each other. Nearly all carpet fragments show different patterns and ornaments.

The Beyşehir rugs are closely related to the Konya specimen in design and colour. In contrast to the "animal carpets" of the following period, depictions of animals are rarely seen in the Seljuq fragments. Rows of horned quadrupeds placed opposite to each other, or birds beside a tree can be recognized on some fragments.

The style of the Seljuq rugs has parallels amongst the architectural decoration of contemporaneous mosques such as those at Divriği, Sivas, and Erzurum, and may be related to Byzantine art. Today, the rugs are kept at the Mevlana Museum in Konya, and at the Turkish and Islamic Arts Museum in Istanbul.

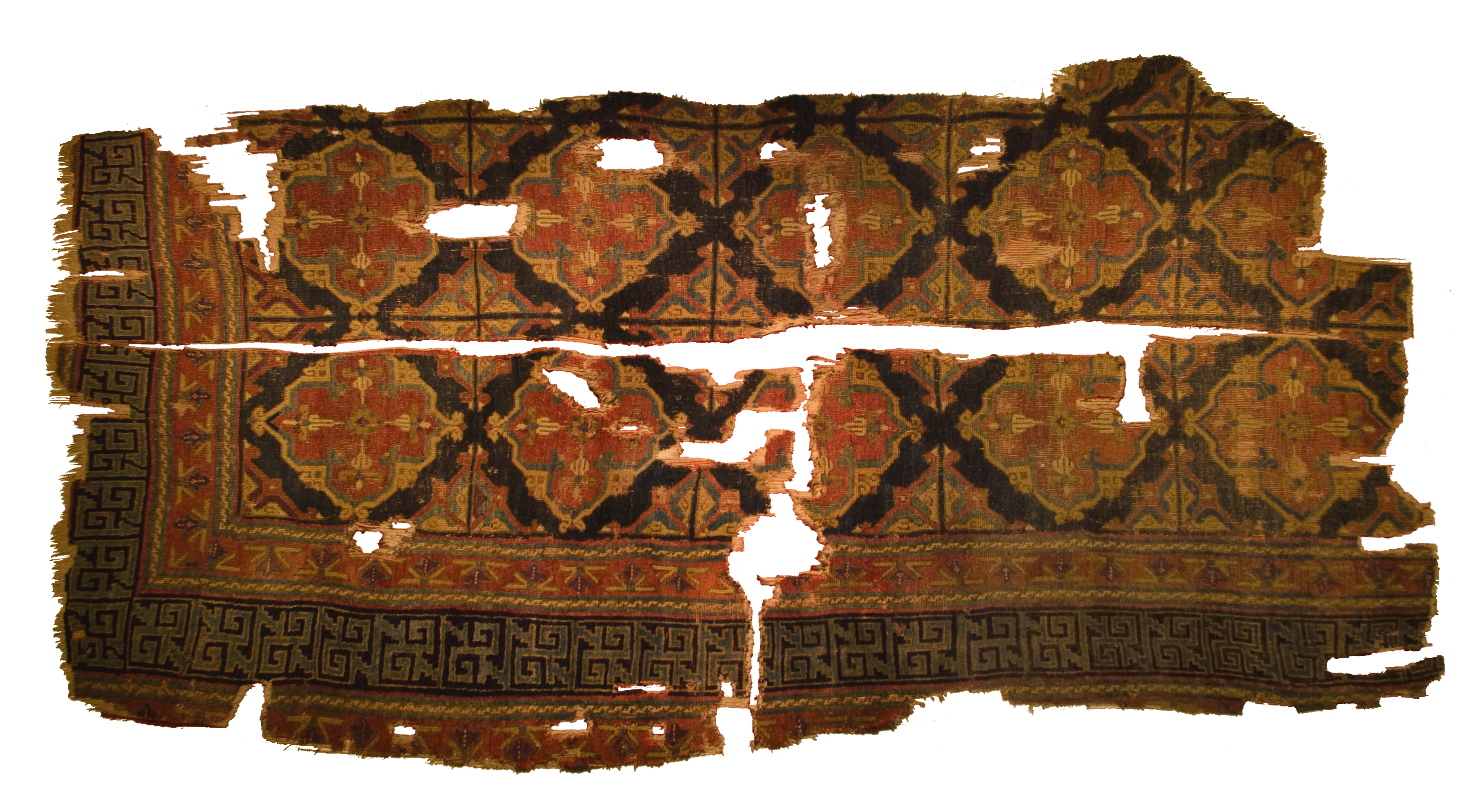
Rug fragment from Eşrefoğlu Mosque, Beysehir, Turkey. Seljuq Period, 13th century.

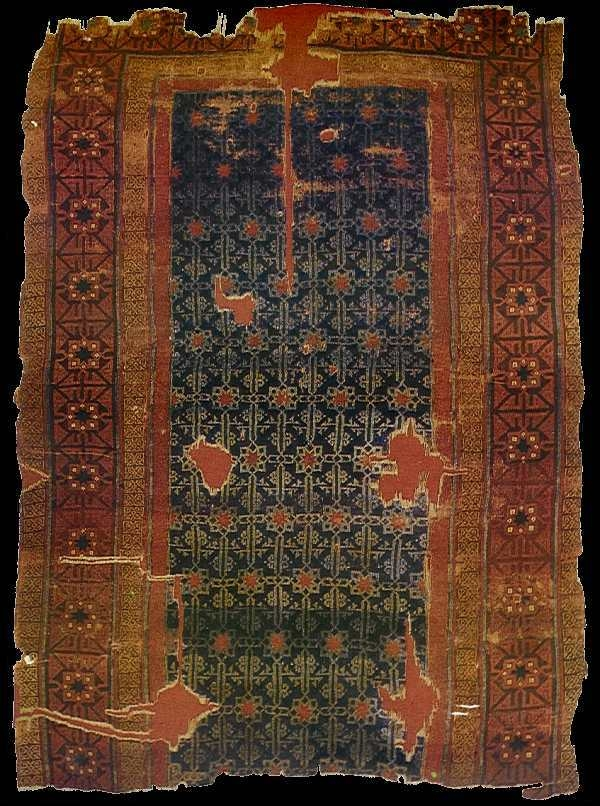
Seljuq carpet, 320 x 240 cm, from Alaeddin Mosque, Konya, 13th century

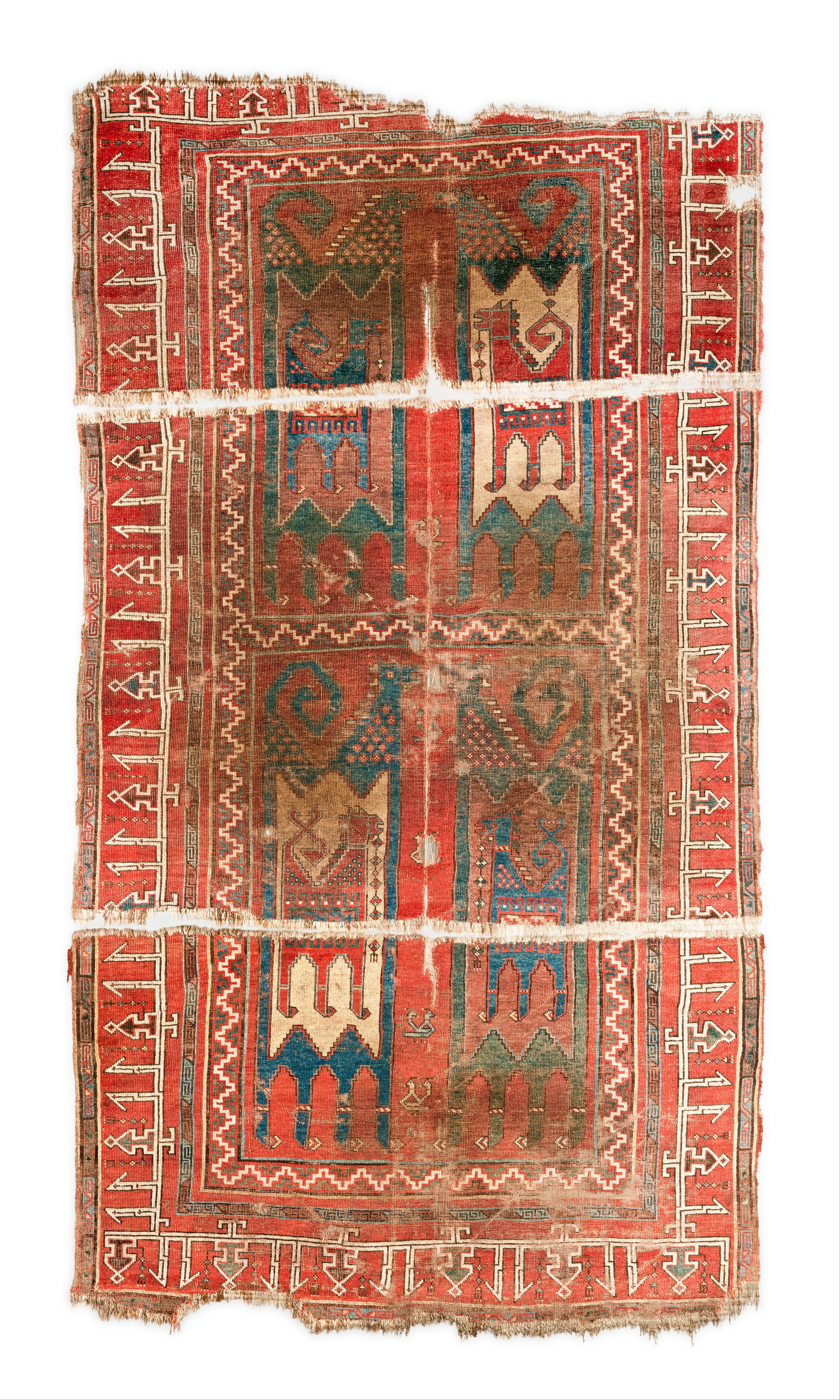
Animal carpet, dated to the 11th–13th century, Museum of Islamic Art, Doha

=== Rugs of the Anatolian Beyliks ===
Early in the thirteenth century, the territory of Anatolia was invaded by Mongols. The weakening of Seljuq rule allowed Turkmen tribes known as the Oghuz Turks to organize themselves into independent sovereignties, the Beyliks. These were later integrated into the Ottoman Empire by the sultans Bayezid I (1389–1402), Murad II (1421–1481), Mehmed the Conqueror (1451–1481), and Selim I (1512–1520).

Literary sources like the Book of Dede Korkut confirm that the Turkoman tribes produced carpets in Anatolia. What types of carpets were woven by the Turkoman Beyliks remains unknown, since we are unable to identify them. One of the Turkoman tribes of the Beylik group, the Tekke settled in South-western Anatolia in the eleventh century, and moved back to the Caspian sea later. The Tekke tribes of Turkmenistan, living around Merv and the Amu Darya during the 19th century and earlier, wove a distinct type of carpet characterized by stylized floral motifs called guls in repeating rows.

=== Ottoman carpets ===
Around 1300 AD, a group of Turkmen tribes under Suleiman and Ertugrul moved westward. Under Osman I, they founded the Ottoman Empire in northwestern Anatolia; in 1326, the Ottomans conquered Bursa, which became the first capital of the Ottoman state. By the late 15th century, the Ottoman state had become a major power. In 1517, the Egyptian Sultanate of the Mamluks was overthrown in the Ottoman–Mamluk war.

Suleiman the Magnificent, the tenth Sultan (1520–1566), invaded Persia and forced the Persian Shah Tahmasp (1524–1576) to move his capital from Tabriz to Qazvin, until the Peace of Amasya was agreed upon in 1555.

As the political and economical influence grew of the Ottoman Empire, Istanbul became a meeting point of diplomats, merchants and artists. During Suleiman I.'s reign, artists and artisans of different specialities worked together in court manufactures (Ehl-i Hiref). Calligraphy and miniature painting were performed in the calligraphy workshops, or nakkaşhane, and influenced carpet weaving. Besides Istanbul, Bursa, Iznik, Kütahya and Ushak were homes to manufactories of different specializations. Bursa became known for its silk cloths and brocades, Iznik and Kütahya were famous for ceramics and tiles, Uşak, Gördes, and Ladik for their carpets. The Ushak region, one of the centers of Ottoman "court" production, Holbein and Lotto carpets were woven here. Gold-brocaded silk velvet carpets known as Çatma are associated with the old Ottoman capital of Bursa, in Western Anatolia near the Sea of Marmara.

==== 15th century "animal" rugs ====
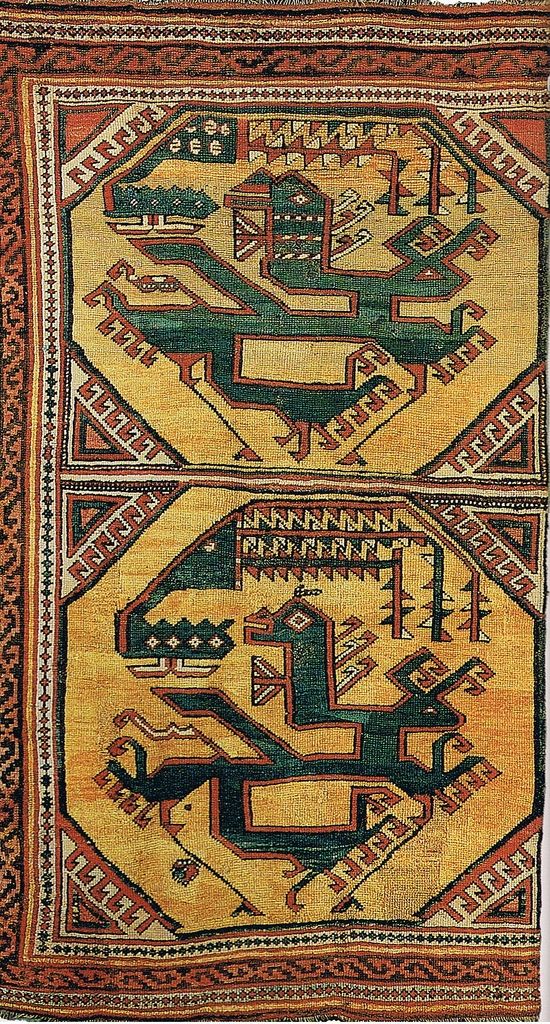
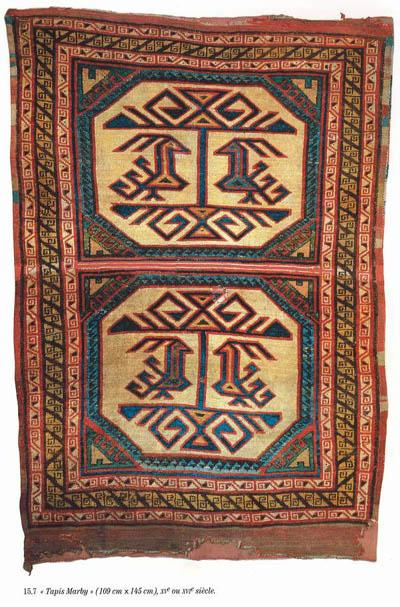
Left image: Phoenix and Dragon carpet, 164 x 91 cm, Anatolia, circa 1500, Pergamon Museum, Berlin
Right image: Animal carpet, around 1500, found in Marby Church, Jämtland, Sweden. Wool, 160 cm x 112 cm, Swedish History Museum, Stockholm

Very few carpets still exist today which represent the transition between the late Seljuq and early Ottoman period. A traditional Chinese motif, the fight between phoenix and dragon, is seen in an Anatolian rug today at the Pergamon Museum, Berlin. Radiocarbon dating confirmed that the "Dragon and Phoenix" carpet was woven in the mid 15th century, during the early Ottoman Empire. It is knotted with symmetric knots. The Chinese motif was probably introduced into Islamic art by the Mongols during the thirteenth century. Another carpet showing two medallions with two birds besides a tree was found in the Swedish church of Marby. More fragments were found in Fostat, today a suburb of the city of Cairo. A carpet with serial bird-and-tree medallions is shown in Sano di Pietro's painting "Marriage of the Virgin" (1448–52).

The "Dragon and Phoenix" and the "Marby" rugs were the only existing examples of Anatolian animal carpets known until 1988. Since then, seven more carpets of this type have been found. They survived in Tibetan monasteries and were removed by monks fleeing to Nepal during the Chinese cultural revolution. One of these carpets was acquired by the Metropolitan Museum of Art which parallels a painting by the Sienese artist Gregorio di Cecco: "The Marriage of the Virgin", 1423. It shows large confronted animals, each with a smaller animal inside.

More animal carpets were depicted in Italian paintings of the 14th and 15th century, and thus represent the earliest Oriental carpets shown in Renaissance paintings. Although only few examples for early Anatolian carpets have survived, European paintings inform the knowledge about late Seljuk and early Ottoman carpets. By the end of the 15th century, geometrical ornaments became more frequent.

==== Holbein and Lotto carpets ====
Based on the distribution and size of their geometric medallions, a distinction is made between "large" and "small" Holbein carpets. The small Holbein type is characterized by small octagons, frequently including a star, which are distributed over the field in a regular pattern, surrounded by arabesques. The large Holbein type show two or three large medallions, often including eight-pointed stars. Their field is often covered in minute floral ornaments. These "Ushak" carpets can be found in places such as the MAK in Vienna, the Louvre in Paris, and the Metropolitan Museum of Art.

Lotto carpets show a yellow grid of geometric arabesques, with interchanging cruciform, octagonal, or diamond shaped elements. The oldest examples have "kufic" borders. The field is always red, and is covered with bright yellow leaves on an underlying rapport of octagonal or rhombiform elements. Carpets of various sizes up to 6 meters square are known. Ellis distinguishes three principal design groups for Lotto carpets: the Anatolian-style, kilim-style, and ornamental style.

Holbein and Lotto carpets have little in common with decorations and ornaments seen on Ottoman art objects other than carpets. Briggs demonstrated similarities between both types of carpets, and Timurid carpets depicted in miniature paintings. The Holbein and Lotto carpets may represent a design tradition dating back to the Timurid period.

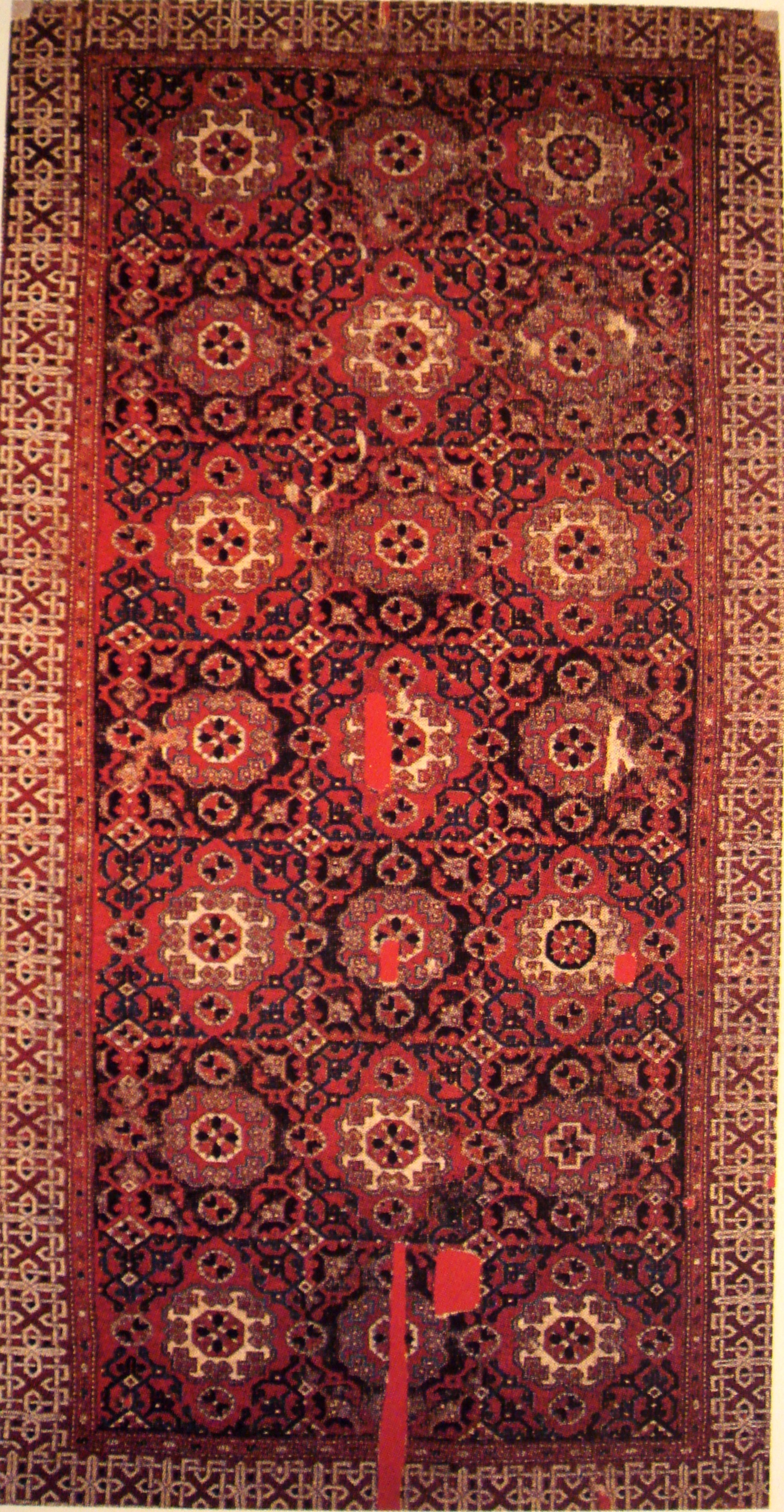
Type I small-pattern Holbein carpet, Anatolia, 16th century.

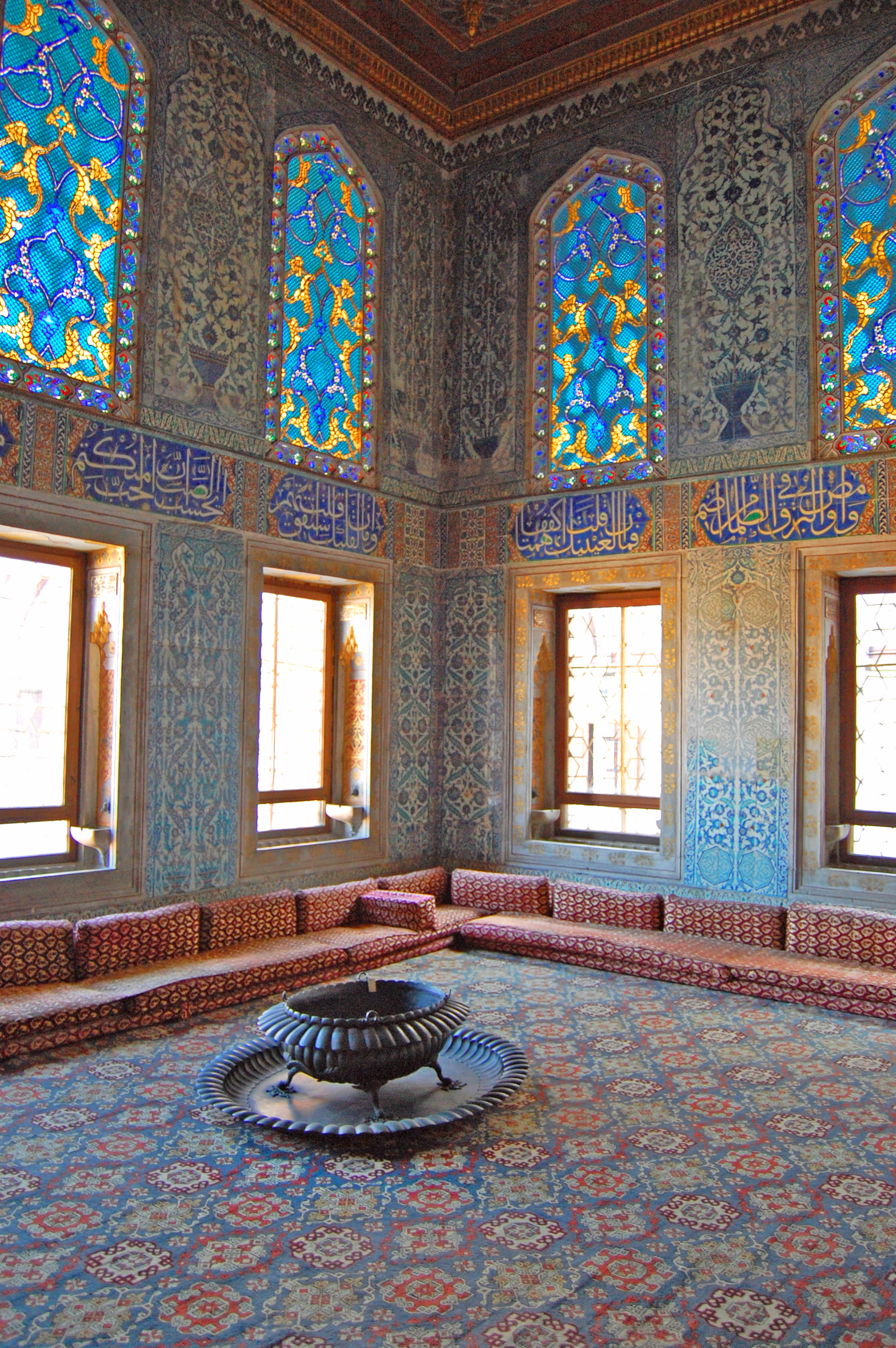
The Harem Room, Topkapi Palace, carpet with a small-pattern "Holbein" design

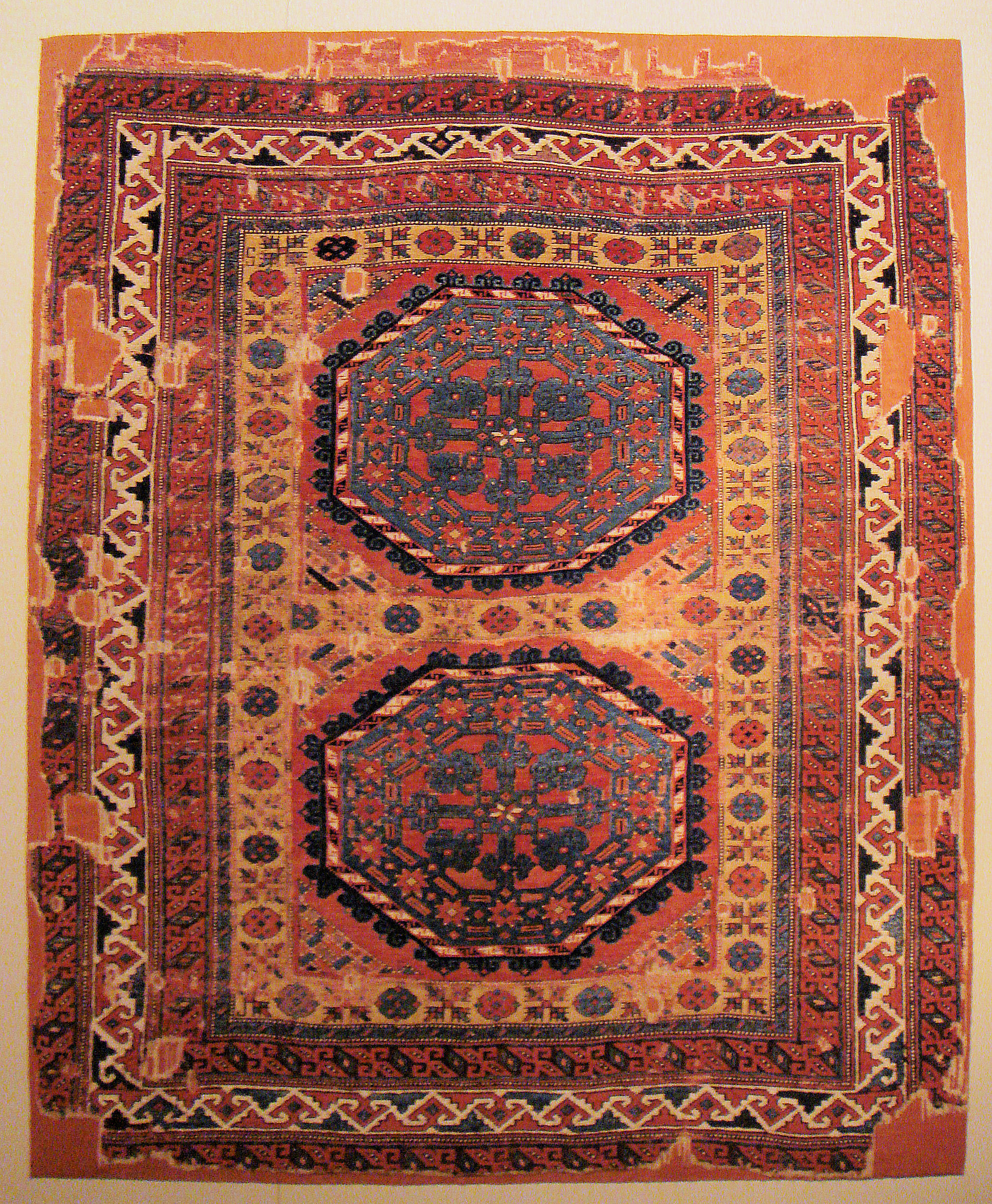
Type IV large-pattern Holbein carpet, 16th century, Central Anatolia.

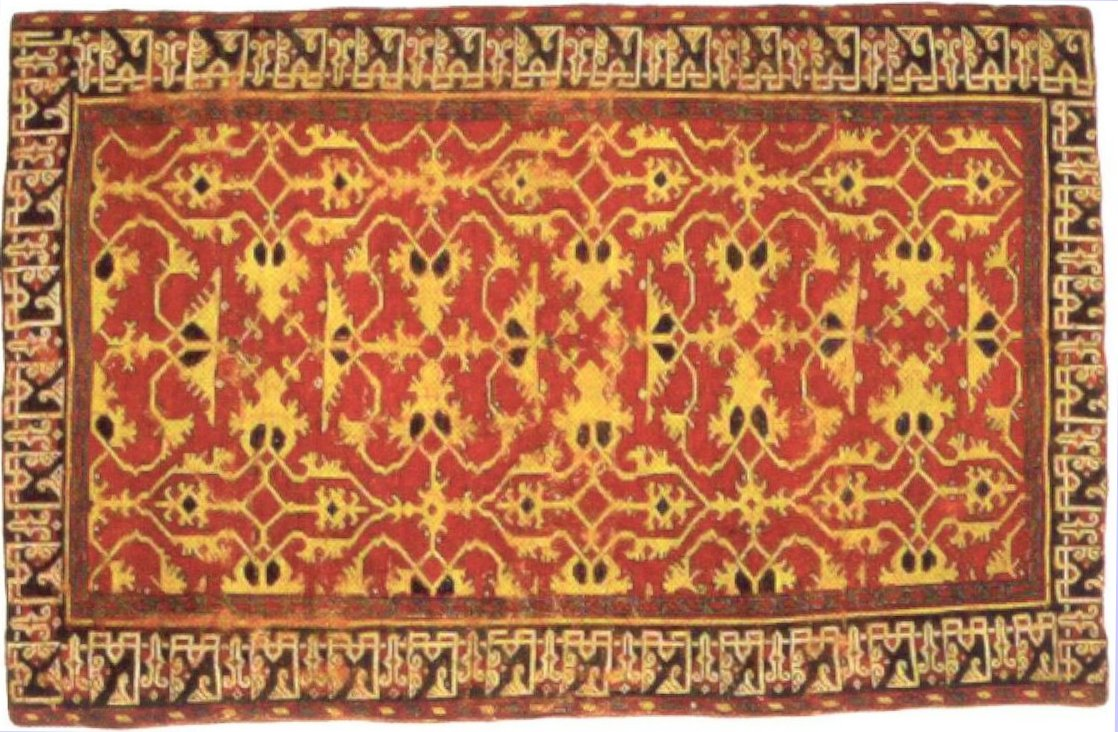
Western Anatolian ‘Lotto’-rug, 16th century, Saint Louis Art Museum

==== Ushak carpets ====
Star Ushak carpets were woven in large formats. They are characterized by large dark blue star shaped primary medallions in infinite repeat on a red ground field containing a secondary floral scroll. The design was likely influenced by northwest Persian book design, or by Persian carpet medallions. As compared to the medallion Ushak carpets, the concept of the infinite repeat in star Ushak carpets is more accentuated and in keeping with the early Turkish design tradition. Because of their strong allusion to the infinite repeat, the star Ushak design can be used on carpets of various size and in many varying dimensions.

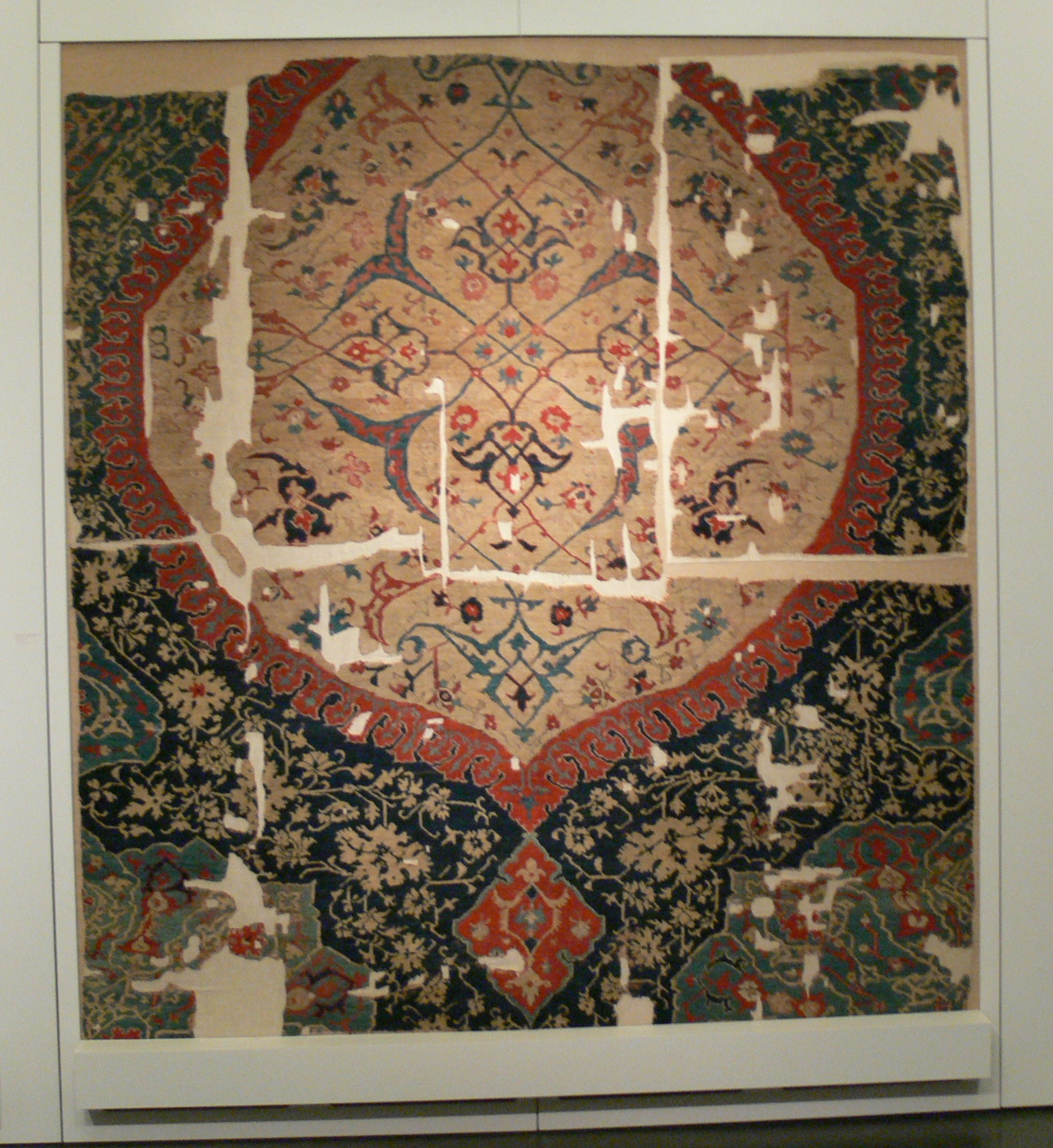
Fragment of a Medallion Ushak carpet, ca. 1600. Museum of Islamic Art, Berlin

Medallion Ushak carpets usually have a red or blue field decorated with a floral trellis or leaf tendrils, ovoid primary medallions alternating with smaller eight-lobed stars, or lobed medallions, intertwined with floral tracery. Their border frequently contains palmettes on a floral and leaf scroll, and pseudo-kufic characters.

Medallion Ushak carpets with their curvilinear patterns significantly depart from the designs of earlier Turkish carpets. Their emergence in the sixteenth century hints at a potential impact of Persian designs. Since the Ottoman Turks occupied the former Persian capital of Tabriz in the first half of the sixteenth century, they would have knowledge of, and access to Persian medallion carpets. Several examples are known to have been in Turkey at an early date, such as the carpet that Erdmann found in the Topkapı Palace. The Ushak carpet medallion, however, conceived as part of an endless repeat, represents a specific Turkish idea, and is different from the Persian understanding of a self-contained central medallion.

Star and medallion Ushaks represent an important innovation, as in them, floral ornaments appear in Turkish carpets for the first time. The replacement of floral and foliate ornaments by geometrical designs, and the substitution of the infinite repeat by large, centered compositions of ornaments, was termed by Kurt Erdmann the "pattern revolution".

Another small group of Ushak carpets is called Double-niche Ushaks. In their design, the corner medallions have been moved closely together, so that they form a niche on both ends of the carpet. This has been understood as a prayer rug design, because a pendant resembling a mosque lamp is suspended from one of the niches. The resulting design scheme resembles the classical Persian medallion design. Counterintuitive to the prayer rug design, some of the double niche Ushaks have central medallions as well. Double niche Ushaks thus may provide an example for the integration of Persian patterns into an older Anatolian design tradition.

==== White ground (Selendi) rugs ====
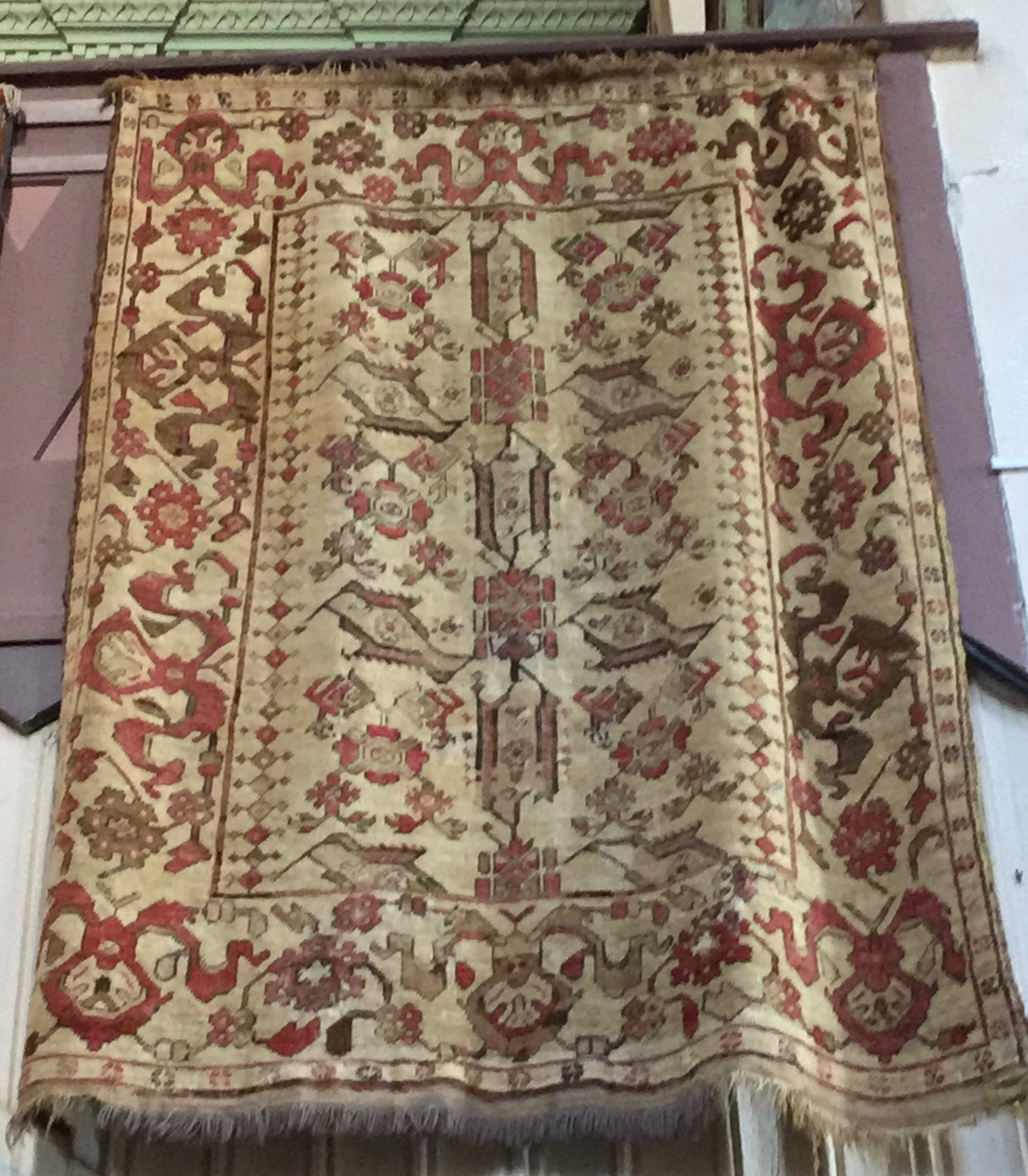
White-ground "Selendi" rug with bird-like ornaments. Monastery Church of Sighișoara, Romania.

Examples are also known of rugs woven in the Ushak area whose fields are covered by ornaments like the Cintamani motif, made of three coloured orbs arranged in triangles, often with two wavy bands positioned under each triangle. This motiv usually appears on a white ground. Together with the bird and a very small group of so-called scorpion rugs, they form a group of known as "white ground rugs". Bird rugs have an allover geometrical field design of repeating quatrefoils enclosing a rosette. Although geometric in design, the pattern has similarities to birds. The rugs of the white ground group have been attributed to the nearby town of Selendi, based on an Ottoman official price list (narh defter) of 1640 which mentions a "white carpet with leopard design".

==== Ottoman Cairene rugs ====
After the 1517 Ottoman conquest of the Mamluk Sultanate in Egypt, two different cultures merged. The earlier tradition of the Mamluk carpet used "S" (clockwise) spun and "Z" (anti-clockwise)-plied wool, and a limited palette of colours and shades. After the conquest, the Cairene weavers adopted an Ottoman Turkish design. The production of these carpets continued in Egypt, and probably also in Anatolia, into the early 17th century.

==== "Transylvanian" rugs ====
Transylvania, in present-day Romania was part of the Ottoman Empire from 1526 to 1699. It was an important center for the carpet trade with Europe. Carpets were also valued in Transylvania, and Turkish carpets were used as decorative wall furnishings in Christian Protestant churches. Amongst others, the Brașov Black Church still shelters a variety of Anatolian carpets, called by convenience "Transylvanian carpets". By their preservation in Christian churches, unusual as the setting may be, the carpets were protected from wear and the changes of history, and often remained in excellent condition. Amongst these carpets are well-preserved Holbein, Lotto, and Bird Ushak carpets.

The carpets termed "Transsylvanian carpets" by convenience today are of Ottoman origin, and were woven in Anatolia. Usually their format is small, with borders of oblong, angular cartouches whose centers are filled with stylized, counterchanging vegetal motifs, sometimes interspersed with shorter stellated rosettes or cartouches. Their field often has a prayer niche design, with two pairs of vases with flowering branches symmetrically arranged towards the horizontal axis. In other examples, the field decor is condensed into medallions of concentric lozenges and rows of flowers. The spandrels of the prayer niche contain stiff arabesques or geometrical rosettes and leaves. The ground colour is yellow, red, or dark blue. The Transylvanian church records, as well as Netherlandish paintings from the seventeenth century which depict in detail carpets with this design, allow for precise dating.

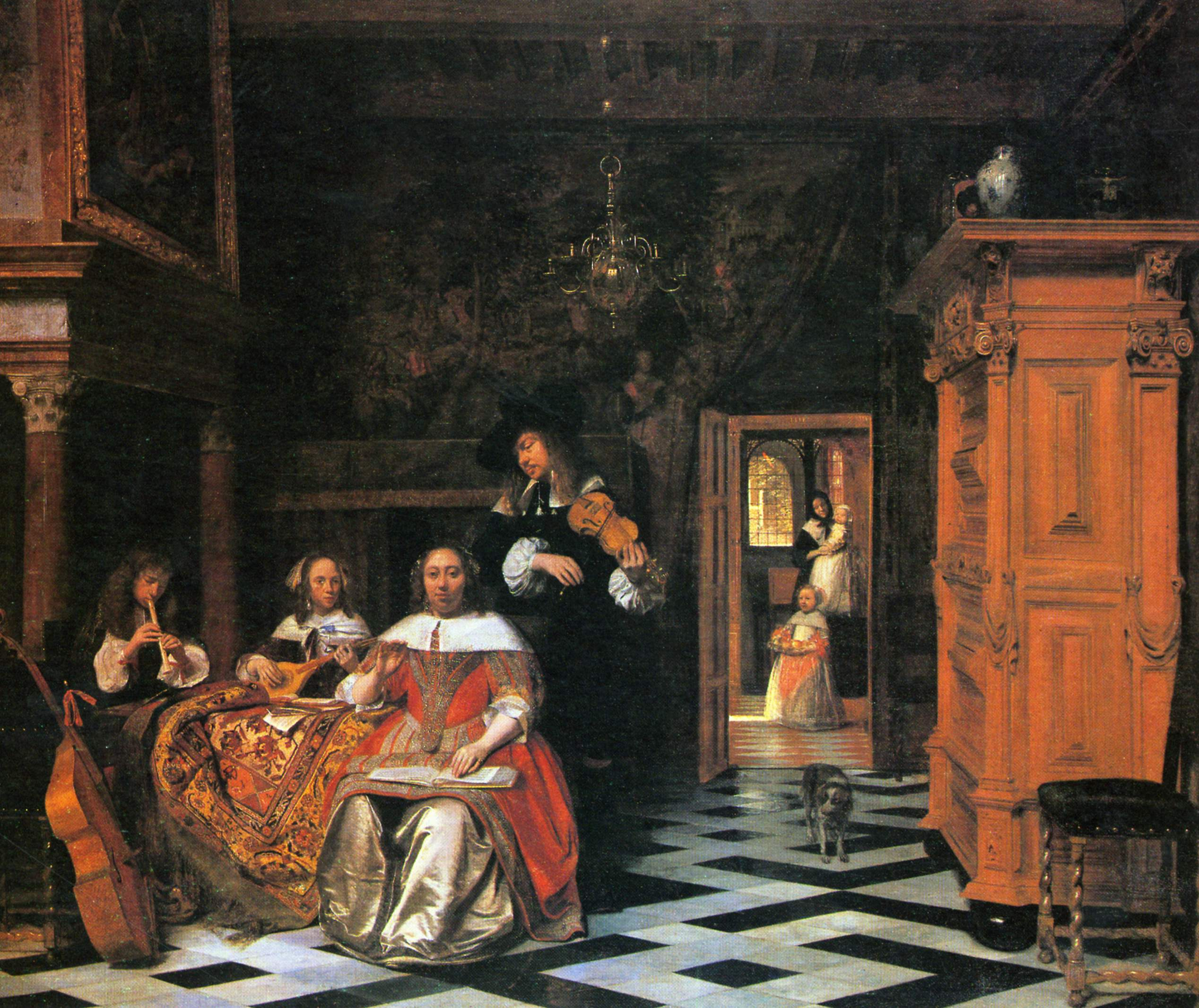
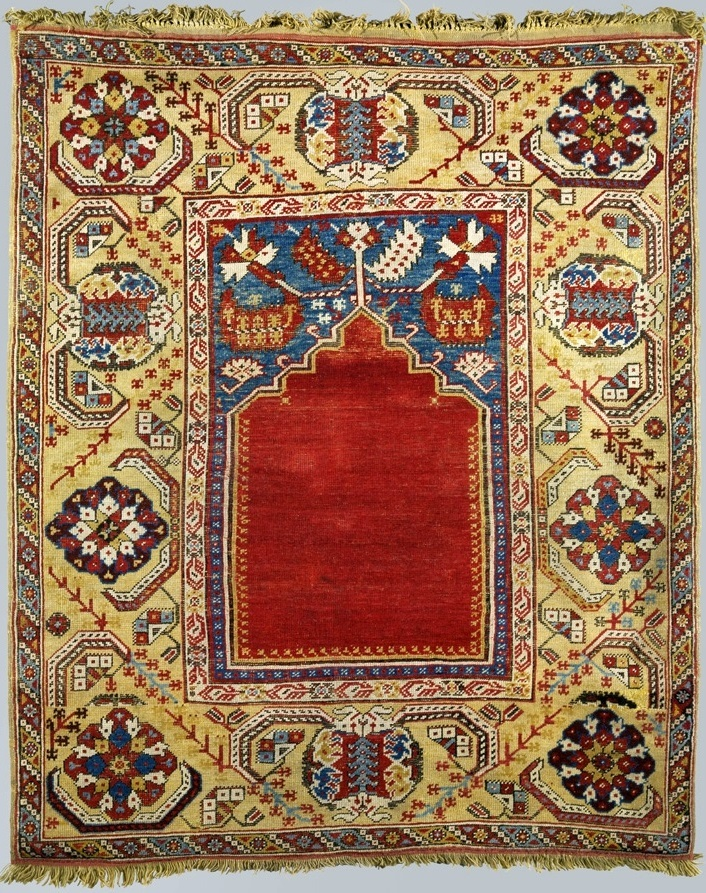
Left image: Pieter de Hooch: Portrait of a family making music, 1663, Cleveland Museum of Art
Right image: "Transylvanian" type prayer rug, 17th century, National Museum, Warsaw

By the time "Transylvanian" carpets appear in Western paintings for the first time, royal and aristocratic subjects had mostly progressed to sit for portraits which depict Persian carpets. Less wealthy sitters are still shown with the Turkish types: The 1620 Portrait of Abraham Grapheus by Cornelis de Vos, and Thomas de Keyser's "Portrait of an unknown man" (1626) and "Portrait of Constantijn Huyghens and his clerk" (1627) are amongst the earliest paintings depicting the "Transylvanian" types of Ottoman Turkish manufactory carpets. Transylvanian vigesimal accounts, customs bills, and other archived documents provide evidence that these carpets were exported to Europe in large quantities. Probably the increase in production reflects the increasing demand by an upper middle class who now could afford to buy these carpets. Pieter de Hoochs 1663 painting "Portrait of a family making music" depicts an Ottoman prayer rug of the "Transylvanian" type.

Anatolian carpets of the "Transylvanian" type were also kept in other European churches in Hungary, Poland, Italy and Germany, whence they were sold, and reached European and American museums and private collections. Aside from the Transylvanian churches, the Brukenthal National Museum in Sibiu, Romania, the Museum of Fine Arts (Budapest), the Metropolitan Museum of Art, and the Skokloster Castle near Stockholm in Sweden keep important collections of "Transylvanian" carpets.

Carpets are rarely found in Anatolia itself from the transitional period between the classical Ottoman era and the nineteenth century. The reason for this remains unclear. Carpets which can be reliably dated to the eighteenth century are of a small format. At the same time, western European residences were more sparely equipped with Oriental carpets. It seems likely that carpets were not exported in large scale during this time.

==== 19th century: "Mecidi" style, and the Hereke court manufacture ====
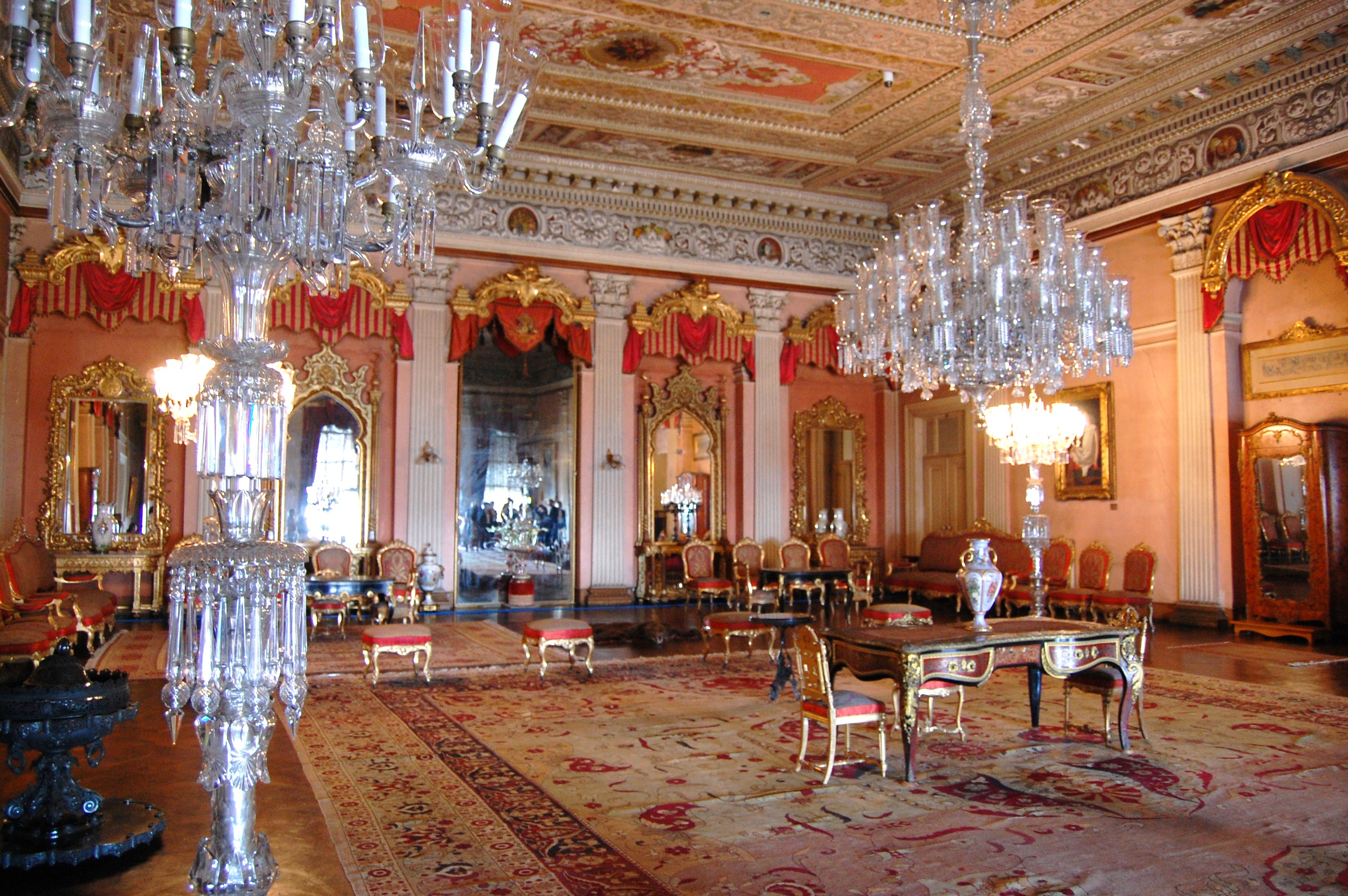
Dolmabahçe Palace, Pink Hall, with typical "mecidi"-style carpet

By the end of the eighteenth century, the "turkish baroque" or "mecidi" style developed out of French baroque designs. Carpets were woven after the patterns of French Savonnerie and Aubusson tapestry. Sultan Abdülmecid I (1839–1861) built the Dolmabahçe Palace, modelled after the Palace of Versailles.

A weaving workshop was established in 1843 in Hereke that supplied the royal palaces with silk brocades and other textiles. The Hereke Imperial Factory included looms that produced cotton fabric, in 1850 the cotton looms were moved to a factory in Bakirkoy, west of Istanbul, being replaced by Jacquard looms. Within its early years of production, it had only produced textiles exclusively for the Ottoman palaces, and in 1878, a fire had caused extensive damage and had closed production until 1882. Carpet production had begun in Hereke in 1891 and became a center for expert carpet weavers.

Hereke carpets are known primarily for their fine weave. Silk thread or fine wool yarn and occasionally gold, silver and cotton thread are used in their production. Wool carpets produced for the palace had 60–65 knots per square centimeter, while silk carpets had 80–100 knots.

The oldest Hereke carpets, now exhibited in Topkapı and other palaces in Istanbul, contain a wide variety of colours and designs. The typical "palace carpet" features intricate floral designs, including the tulip, daisy, carnation, crocus, rose, lilac, and hyacinth. It often has quarter medallions in the corners. The medallion designs of earlier Ushak carpets was widely used at the Hereke factory. These medallions are curved on the horizontal axis and taper to points on the vertical axis. Hereke prayer rugs feature patterns of geometric motifs, tendrils and lamps as background designs within the representation of a mihrab (prayer niche). Once referring solely to carpets woven at Hereke, the term "Hereke carpet" now refers to any high quality carpet woven using similar techniques.

=== Modern history: Decline and revival ===
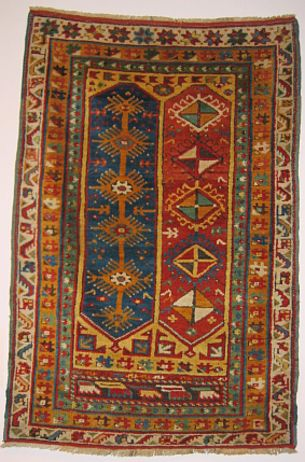
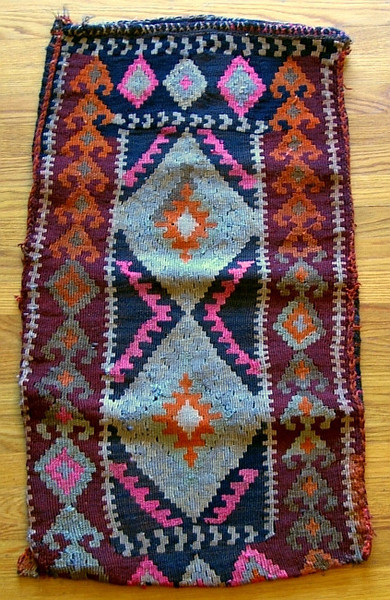
Left image: Pile rug, circa 1875; Southwestern Anatolia, with bright but harmonic natural dyes
Right image: Tribal Kurdish Cuval, ca. 1880 in traditional design, with harsh synthetic colours.

The modern history of carpets and rugs began in the nineteenth century when increasing demand for handmade carpets arose on the international market. However, the traditional, hand-woven, naturally dyed Turkish carpet is a very labour-intense product, as each step in its manufacture requires considerable time, from the preparation, spinning, dyeing of the wool to setting up the loom, knotting each knot by hand, and finishing the carpet before it goes to market. In an attempt to save on resources and cost, and maximise on profit in a competitive market environment, synthetic dyes, non-traditional weaving tools like the power loom, and standardized designs were introduced. This led to a rapid breakdown of the tradition, resulting in the degeneration of an art which had been cultivated for centuries. The process was recognized by art historians as early as in 1902. It is hitherto unknown when exactly this process of degeneration started, but it is observed mainly since the large-scale introduction of synthetic colours took place.

In the late twentieth century, the loss of cultural heritage was recognized, and efforts started to revive the tradition. Initiatives were started aiming at re-establishing the ancient tradition of carpet weaving from handspun, naturally dyed wool. The return to traditional dyeing and weaving by the producers, and the renewed customer interest in these carpets was termed by Eilland as the "Carpet Renaissance".

== Carpet weaving: Materials, technique, processes ==
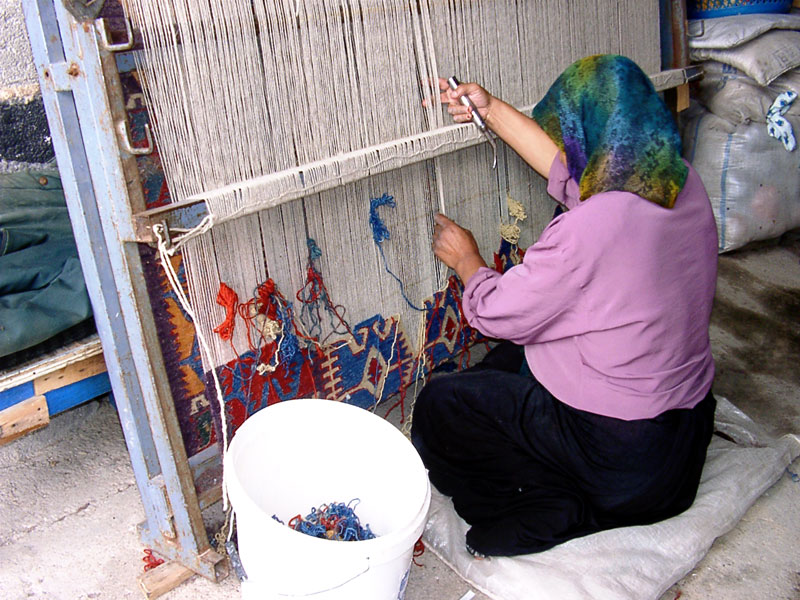
Turkish rug weaver in Konya

In traditional households, women and girls take up carpet and kilim weaving as a hobby as well as a means of earning money. Women learn their weaving skills at an early age, taking months or even years to complete the pile rugs and flat woven kilims that were created for their use in daily life.

=== Materials ===
Makers of handmade rugs use only natural fibres. The most common materials used for the pile are wool, silk and cotton. Nomadic and village weavers sometimes also use goat- and camel-hair. Traditionally, spinning is done by hand. Several strands of yarn are then plied together so that the resulting yarn is strong enough to be used for weaving.

Sheep's wool is the most frequently used pile material in a Turkish rug because it is soft, durable, easy to work with and not too expensive. It is less susceptible to dirt than cotton, does not react electrostatically, and insulates against both heat and cold. This combination of characteristics is not found in other natural fibers. Wool comes from the coats of sheep. Natural wool comes in colors of white, brown, fawn, yellow and gray, which are sometimes used directly without going through a dyeing process, sheep's wool also takes dyes well. Traditionally, wool used for Turkish carpets is spun by hand. Before the yarn can be used for weaving, several strands have to be twisted together for additional strength.

Cotton is used primarily in the foundation, the warps and wefts of rugs. Cotton is stronger than wool, and, when used for the foundation, makes a carpet lie flat on the ground, as it is not as easily distorted as woolen strings. Some weavers, such as Turkomans, also use cotton for weaving small white details into the rug in order to create contrast.

Wool-on-wool (wool pile on wool warp and weft): This is the most traditional type of Anatolian rug. Wool-on-wool carpet weaving dates back further and utilizes more traditional design-motifs than its counterparts. Because wool cannot be spun extra finely, the knot count is often not as high as seen in a "wool-on-cotton" or "silk-on-silk" rug. Wool-on-wool carpets are more frequently attributed to tribal or nomadic production.

Wool-on-cotton (wool pile on cotton warp and weft): This particular combination facilitates a more intricate design-pattern than a "wool-on-wool carpet", as cotton can be finely spun which allows for a higher knot-count. A "wool-on-cotton" rug is often indicative of a town weaver. Due to their higher pile density, wool-on-cotton carpets are heavier than wool-on-wool rugs.

Silk-on-silk (silk pile on silk warp and weft): This is the most intricate type of carpet, featuring a very fine weave. Knot counts on some superior-quality "silk-on-silk" rugs can be as high as 28×28 knots/cm^{2}. Knot counts for silk carpets intended for floor coverings should be no greater than 100 knots per square cm, or 10×10 knots/cm^{2}. Carpets woven with a knot count greater than 10×10 knots/cm^{2} are intended to be used as a wall or pillow tapestry, because their fabric is less resistant to mechanical stress. These very fine, intricately-woven rugs and carpets are usually no larger than 3×3 m.

=== Dyes and dyeing ===
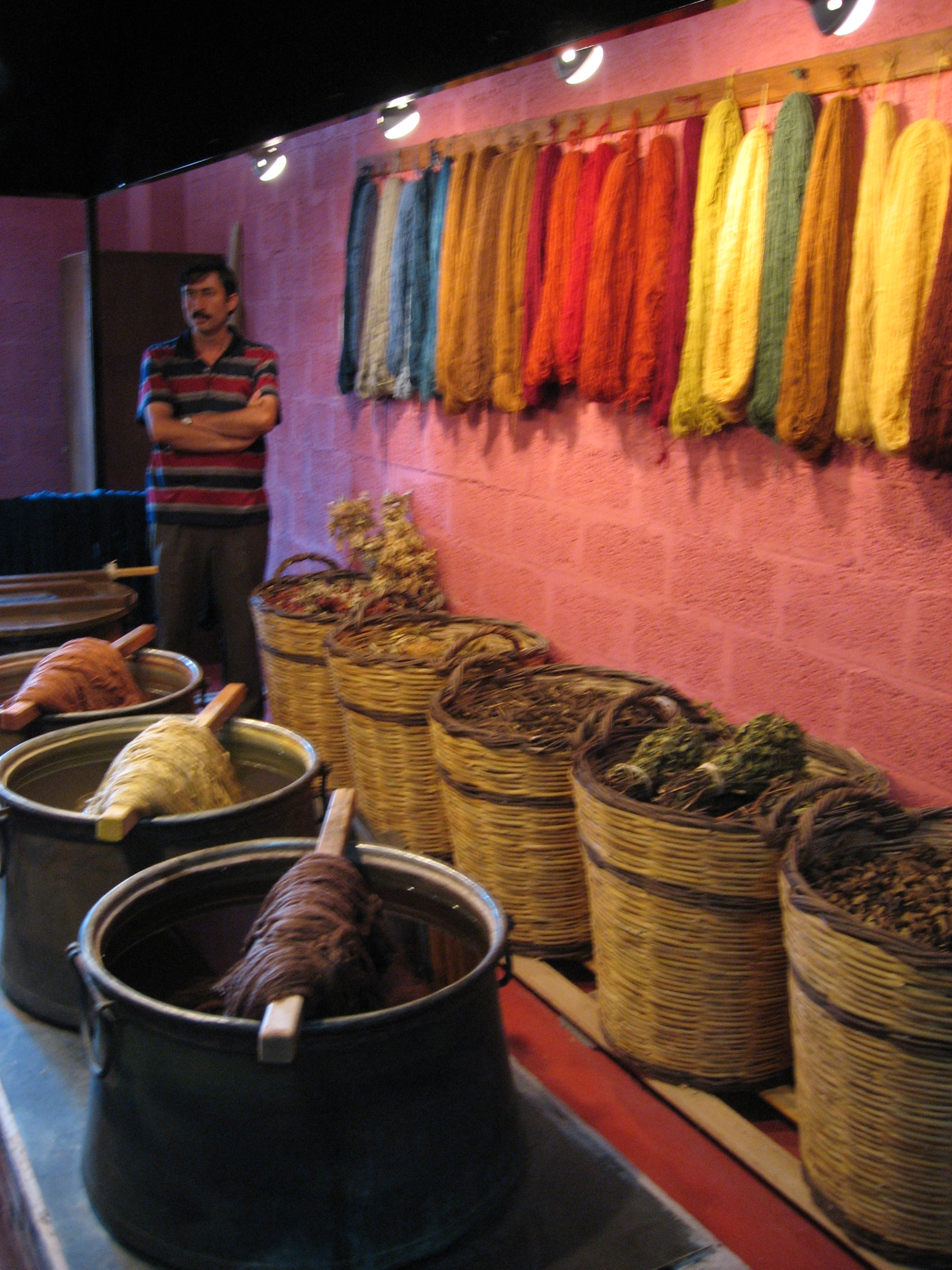
Naturally dyed wool in a Turkish carpet manufacture

Traditional dyes used for Anatolian carpets are obtained from plants, insects and minerals. In 1856, the English chemist William Henry Perkin invented the first aniline dye, mauveine. A variety of other synthetic dyes were invented thereafter. Cheap, readily prepared and easy to use as they were compared to natural dyes, their use is documented in Ushak carpets already by the mid-1860s. The tradition of natural dyeing was recently revived, based on chemical analyses of natural dyes from antique wool samples, and experimental re-creation of dyeing recipes and processes, in the early 1980s.

According to these analyses, natural dyes used in Anatolian rugs include:

- Red from Madder (Rubia tinctorum) roots,
- Yellow from plants, including onion (Allium cepa), several chamomile species (Anthemis, Matricaria chamomilla), and Euphorbia,
- Black: Oak apples, Oak acorns, Tanner's sumach,
- Green by double dyeing with Indigo and yellow dye,
- Orange by double dyeing with madder red and yellow dye,
- Blue: Indigo gained from Indigofera tinctoria.

The dyeing process involves the preparation of the yarn in order to make it susceptible for the proper dyes by immersion in a mordant, immersing the yarn in the dyeing solution, and leaving it to dry exposed to air and sunlight. Some colours, especially dark brown, require iron mordants, which can damage or fade the fabric. This often results in faster pile wear in areas dyed in dark brown colours, and may create a relief effect in antique Turkish carpets.

With modern synthetic dyes, nearly every colour and shade can be obtained so that it is nearly impossible to identify, in a finished carpet, whether natural or artificial dyes were used. Modern carpets can be woven with carefully selected synthetic colours, and provide artistic and utilitarian value.

The Anatolian rug is distinct from carpets of other provenience in that it makes more pronounced use of primary colours. Western Anatolian carpets prefer red and blue colours, whereas Central Anatolian use more red and yellow, with sharp contrasts set in white.

=== Weaving and finishing ===
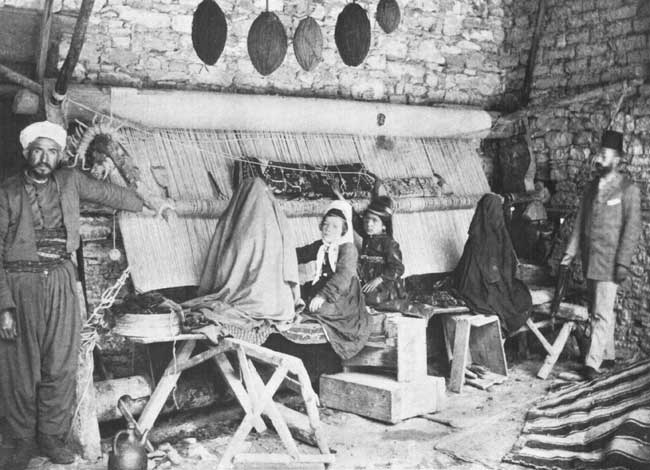
Turkish (roller beam) loom and weavers (1908).

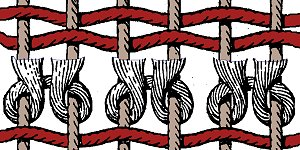
Turkish (symmetric) knot

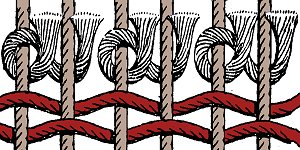
Persian (asymmetric) knot, open to the right

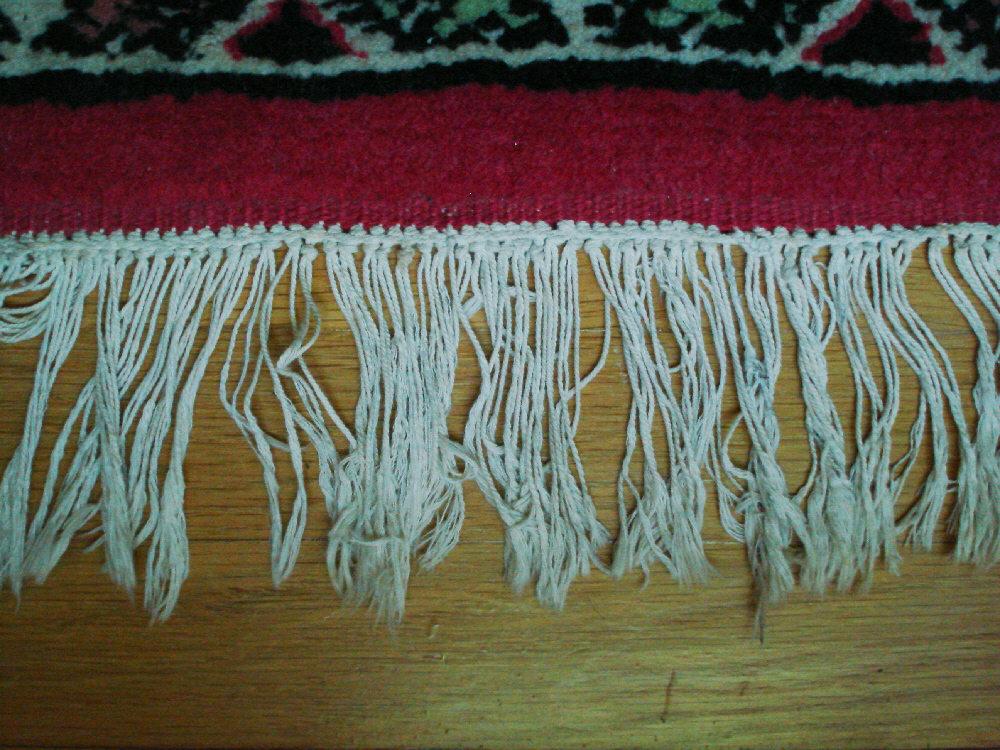
Kilim end and fringes

A variety of tools are needed in the construction of a handmade rug. A loom, a horizontal or upright framework, is needed to mount the vertical warps into which the pile nodes are knotted, and one or more shoots of horizontal wefts are woven ("shot") in after each row of knots in order to further stabilize the fabric. Wefts can be either undyed or dyed, mostly in red and blue.

The pile knots are usually knotted by hand. Most rugs from Anatolia utilize the symmetrical Turkish double knot. Each knot is made on two warps. With this form of knotting, each end of the pile thread is twisted around two warp threads at regular intervals, so that both ends of the knot come up between two strands on one side of the carpet. The thread is then pulled downwards and cut with a knife.

After a row of knots has been inserted, one or two, sometimes more, rows of wefts are woven in, and the fabric is compacted by beating with a heavy comb. Once the carpet is finished, it is cut from the loom. The sides or selvages are usually overcast in wool. The selvages consist of up to ten warp threads. Especially village and nomadic rugs have flat-woven kilim ends, sometimes including pile-woven tribal signs or village crests. The pile of the carpet is shorn with special knives in order to obtain an equal surface. In some carpets, a relief effect is obtained by clipping the pile unevenly. Finally, the carpet is washed before it is used, or goes to the market.

The upright pile of Turkish rugs usually falls in one direction, as knots are always pulled down before the string of pile yarn is cut off and work resumes on the next knot, piling row after row of knots on top of each other. When touching a carpet, this creates a feeling similar to stroking an animal's fur. This can be used to determine where the weaver has started knotting the pile. The pile in Turkish carpets is usually between 2 and 4 mm thick. Coarse nomadic rugs like the Yürük rugs, can be as thick as 12 mm. A special bedding carpet called yatak may reach a pile thickness of 20 to 25 mm.

== Origins and traditions of Anatolian rug design ==
Anatolian rug design integrates different strands of traditions. Specific elements are closely related to the history of Turkic peoples and their interaction with surrounding cultures, in their central Asian origin as well as during their migration, and in Anatolia itself. The most important cultural influences came from the Chinese culture, and from Islam. Carpets from the Bergama and Konya areas are considered as most closely related to earlier Anatolian rugs, and their significance in the history of the art is now better understood.

=== Central Asian traditions ===
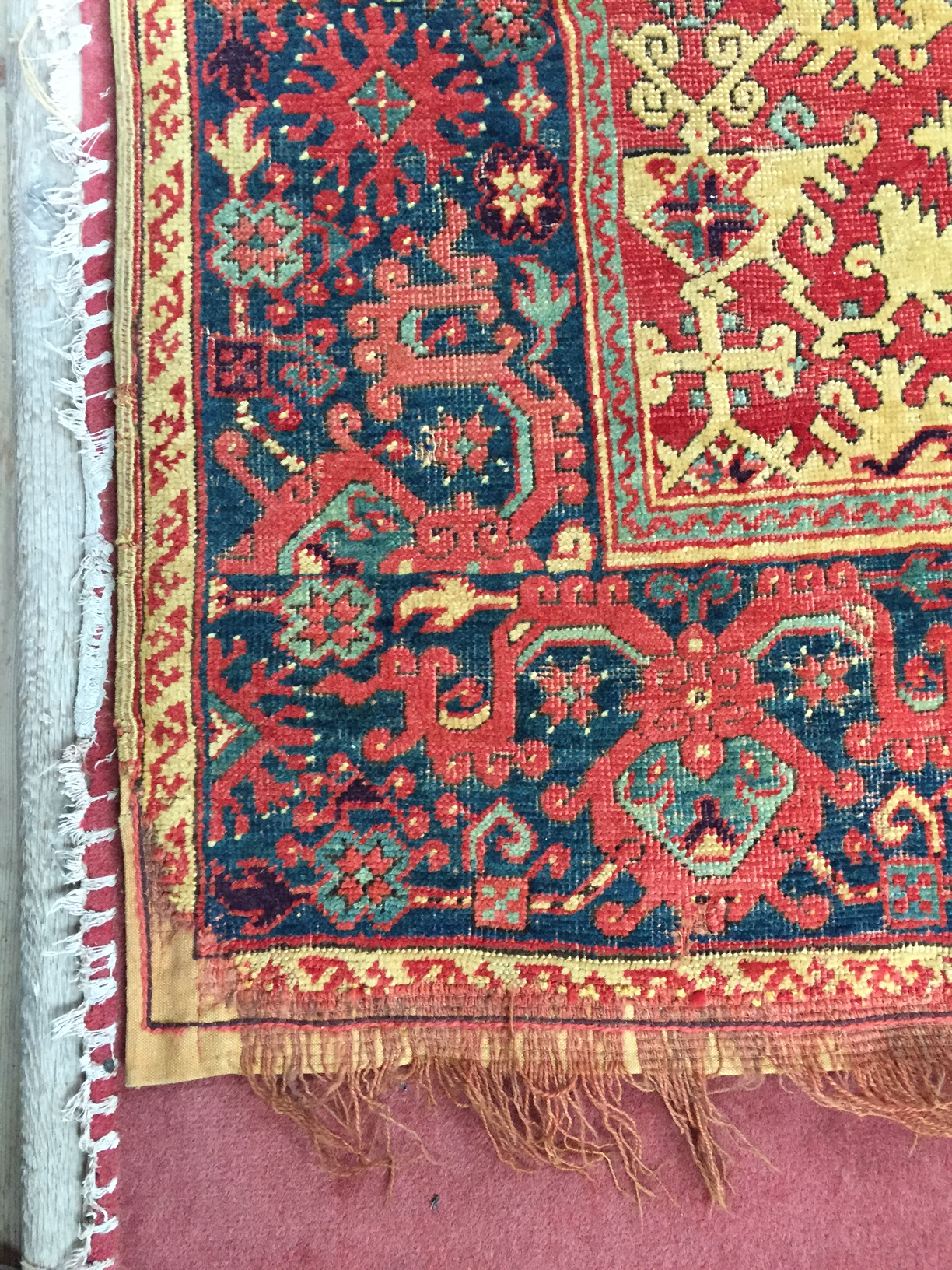
Detail of a "Lotto" rug with a cloud band border. The ornament is assumed to be of Chinese origin. In most Anatolian rugs, the borders are unresolved, i.e., do not continue diagonally.

The early history of the Turkic peoples in Central Asia is closely related to China. Contacts between Turks and China are documented since the early Han dynasty.

In his essay on centralized designs, Thompson relates the central medallion pattern, frequently found in Anatolian rugs to the "lotus pedestal" and "cloud collar (yun chien)" motifs, used in the art of Buddhist Asia, which he dated back to Yuan dynasty China. Recently, Brüggemann further elaborated on the relationship between Chinese and Turkic motifs like the "cloud band" ornament, the origin of which he relates to the Han dynasty. The early Anatolian "Phoenix and Dragon rug" depicts another traditional motif of Chinese mythology, the fight between the phoenix (Fenghuang) and the dragon.

=== Romano-Hellenistic traditions ===
There are documentary records of carpets being used by the ancient Greeks. Homer writes in Ilias XVII,350 that the body of Patroklos is covered with a "splendid carpet". In Odyssey Book VII and X "carpets" are mentioned. Pliny the Elder wrote (nat. VIII, 48) that carpets ("polymita") were invented in Alexandria. It is unknown whether these were flatweaves or pile weaves, as no detailed technical information can be gained from the texts.

Athenaeus of Naucratis describes luxurious carpets in his Deipnosophists, written about 230 AD.

"And under these there were strewed purple carpets of the finest wool, with the carpet pattern on both sides. And there were handsomely embroidered rugs very beautifully elaborated on them." (Book V, p. 314)

"[...] to lie on a couch with silver feet, with a smooth Sardian carpet spread under it of the most expensive description." (Book VI, p. 401)

A carpet "with the pattern on both sides" could either be a flat-woven, or pile-woven carpet. Whether "purple" refers to the colour of the fabric or to the dyestuff (either Tyrian purple or madder red could have been used) remains unknown. The town of Sardis lies in Western Anatolia, thus, this may be the earliest reference to carpet production in the region of Asia minor.

Anatolia was ruled by the Roman Empire since 133 BCE. The East Roman (Byzantine) and Sasanian Empires have coexisted for more than 400 years. Artistically, both empires have developed similar styles and decorative vocabulary, as exemplified by mosaics and architecture of Roman Antioch. A Turkish carpet pattern depicted on Jan van Eyck's "Paele Madonna" painting was traced back to late Roman origins and related to early Islamic floor mosaics found in the Umayyad palace of Khirbat al-Mafjar. The architectural elements seen in the Khirbat al-Mafjar complex are considered exemplary for the continuation of pre-Islamic, Roman designs in early Islamic art.

=== Islamic traditions ===
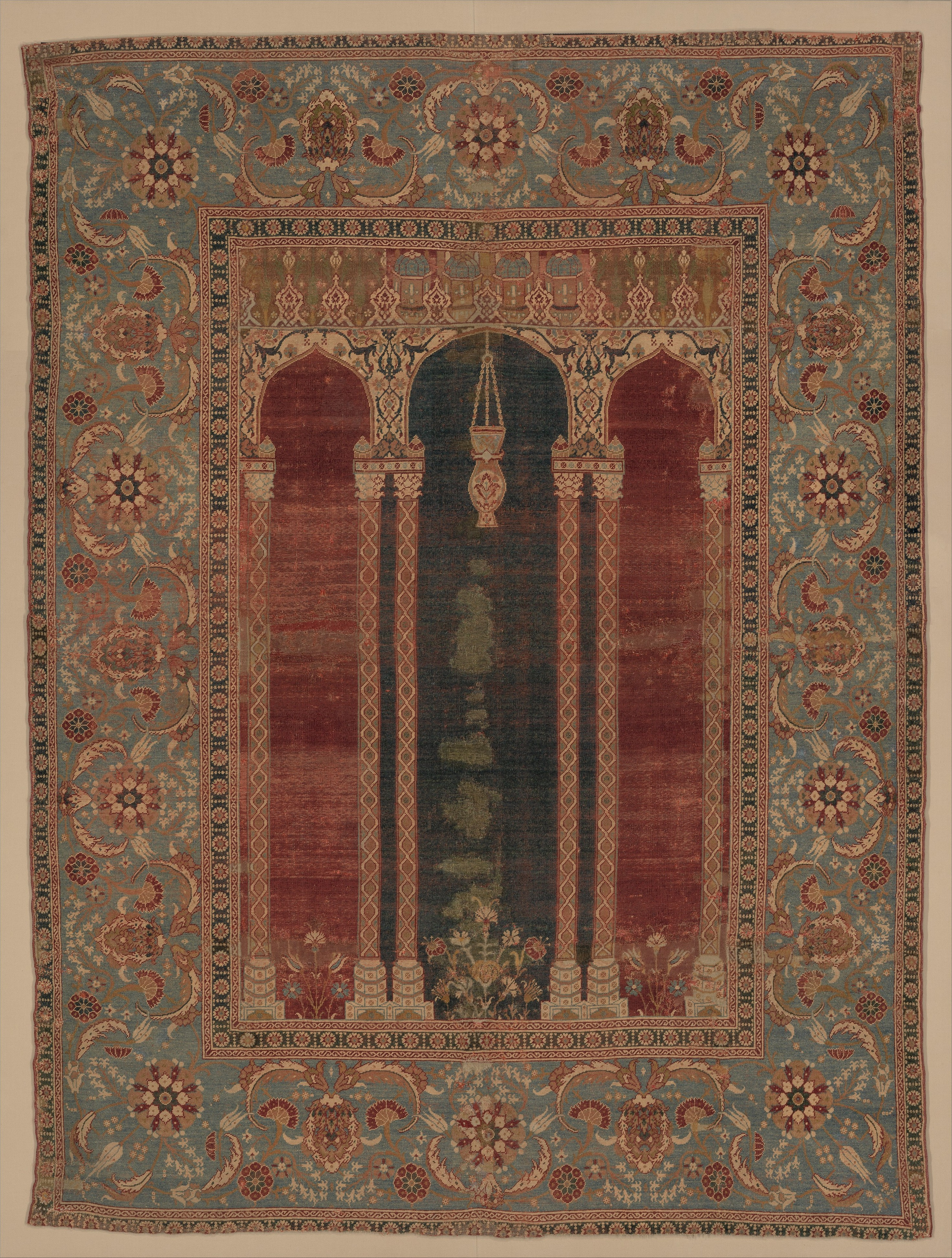
Bursa prayer rug, late 16th century, James F. Ballard collection

When Turkic migrants moved from Central Asia to Anatolia, they were migrating mainly through lands which had already adopted Islam. Depicting animals or humans is prohibited in the Islamic tradition, which does not distinguish between religious and profane life. Since the codification of the Quran by Uthman Ibn Affan in 651 AD/19 AH and the UmayyadAbd al-Malik ibn Marwan reforms, Islamic art has focused on writing and ornament. The borders of Anatolian rugs frequently contain ornaments which were derived from Islamic calligraphy. Usually, these "kufic" borders consist of lam-alif- or alif-lam sequences in an interwoven pattern.

The main fields of Anatolian rugs are frequently filled with redundant, interwoven patterns in "infinite repeat". Thus, the rug represents a section of an infinite pattern, which is imagined as continuing beyond its borders and into the infinite.

A specific Islamic pattern is the mihrab pattern which defines the Prayer rug. A prayer rug is characterized by a niche at one end, representing the mihrab in every mosque, a directional point to direct the worshipper towards Mecca. The mihrab pattern in Turkish carpets is often modified and may consist of a single, double, or vertically or horizontally multiplied niche. Thus the niche pattern can range from a concrete, architectural to a more ornamental understanding of the design. Prayer rugs are often woven "upside down", as becomes apparent when the direction of the pile is felt by touching the carpet. This has both technical (the weaver can focus on the more complicated niche design first), and practical reasons (the pile inclines in the direction of the worshipper's prostration).

=== Other cultural influences ===
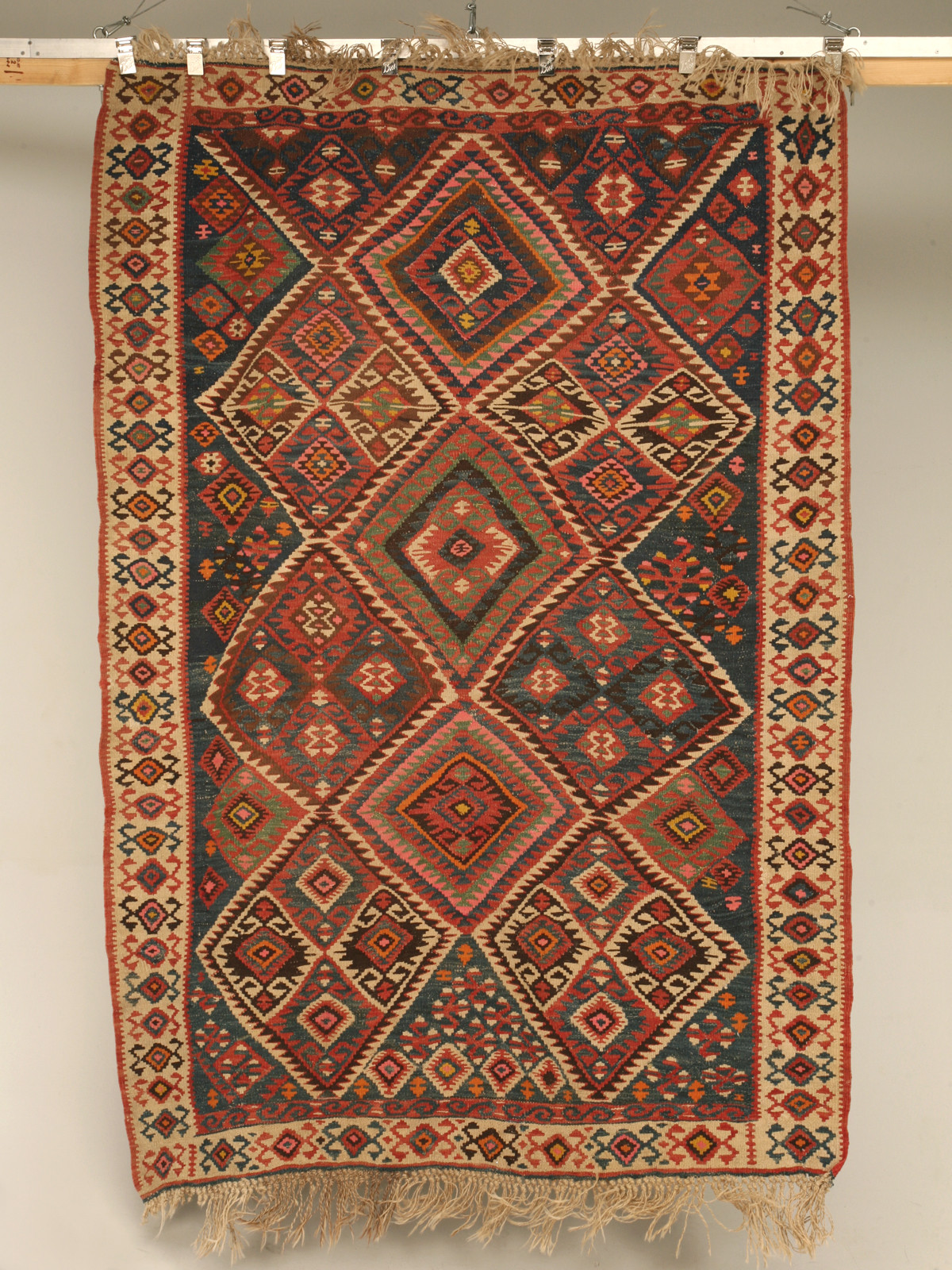
Anatolian kilim with a geometric pattern

Large, geometric shapes are considered to be of Caucasian or Turkmen origin. The Caucasian tradition may have been integrated either by migrating Turkish tribes, or by contact with Turkmen people already living in Anatolia.

A central medallion consisting of large, concentrically reduced rhomboid patterns with latch-hook ornaments is associated with the Yörük nomads of Anatolia. The name Yürük is usually given to nomads whose way of life has changed least from its central Asian origin.

In Anatolia, several ethnic minorities have maintained separate traditions, e.g., the Greek, Armenians, and Kurds. Whilst Greeks and Armenians were involved in carpet weaving and trading in the past, no design motifs have been clearly associated with their distinct, Christian culture. Kurdish rug design differs from Anatolian. Kurdish rugs are more often discussed together with Persian carpets.

=== Social context: Court and town, village and nomadic production ===
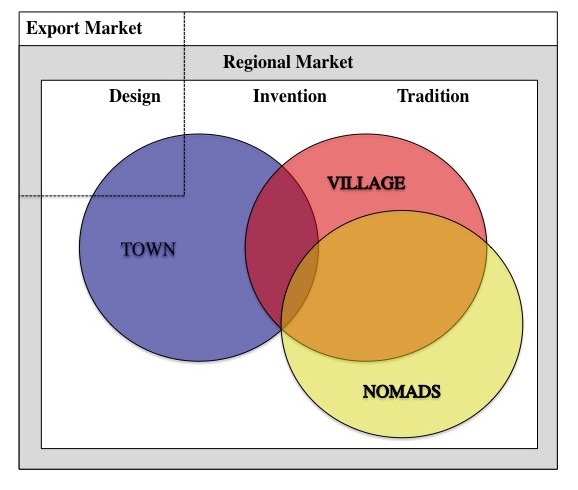
Cultural interactions in traditional carpet production

Carpets and rugs were simultaneously produced by and for the four different social levels of court, town, rural village, and tribe. Elements of town design were often reproduced in rural production, and integrated by the village weavers into their own artistic tradition by a process called stylization.

==== Court manufacture ====
Representative "court" rugs were woven by special workshops, often founded and protected by the sovereign, with the intention to represent power and status. As such, representative carpets have developed a specific design tradition influenced by the courts of the surrounding empires. Rugs were produced in the court manufactures as special commissions or gifts. Their elaborate design required a division of work between an artist who created a design plan (termed "cartoon") on paper, and a weaver who was given the plan for execution on the loom. Thus, artist and weaver were separated.

==== Town and village production ====
Carpets were woven in town manufactures by organized manufactories. Usually, town manufactures have a larger range of patterns and ornaments and more artistically developed designs which can be executed by the weavers, the palette of colours is rich, and the weaving technique may be finer due to their access to high-quality wool, and the employment of specialized weavers. Larger formats can be produced on the larger, stationary looms. Carpets are woven from cartoons, using material provided by the manufacturer. The town manufactories may accept commissions even from foreign countries, and produce carpets for export.

Rugs produced in villages are often produced in individual homes, but at least partly commissioned and supervised by guilds or manufacturers. Home production may not require full-time labour, but could be performed when time allows, besides other household tasks. Village carpets as essential household items were part of a tradition that was at times influenced by, but essentially distinct from the invented designs of the workshop production. Frequently, mosques had acquired rural carpets as charitable gifts, which provided material for studies. Rural carpets rarely include cotton for warps and wefts, and almost never silk, as these materials had to be purchased on the market by the individual weaver.

Patterns and ornaments from court manufactory rugs were reproduced by smaller (town or village) workshops. This process is well documented for Ottoman prayer rugs. As prototypical court designs were passed on to smaller workshops, and from one generation to the next, the design underwent a process termed stylization, comprizing series of small, incremental changes either in the overall design, or in details of smaller patterns and ornaments, over time. As a result, the prototype may be modified to an extent as to be barely recognizable. Initially misunderstood as the "degeneration" of a design, the process of stylization is now regarded as a genuine creative process within a distinct design tradition.

Stylization in Anatolian prayer rug design

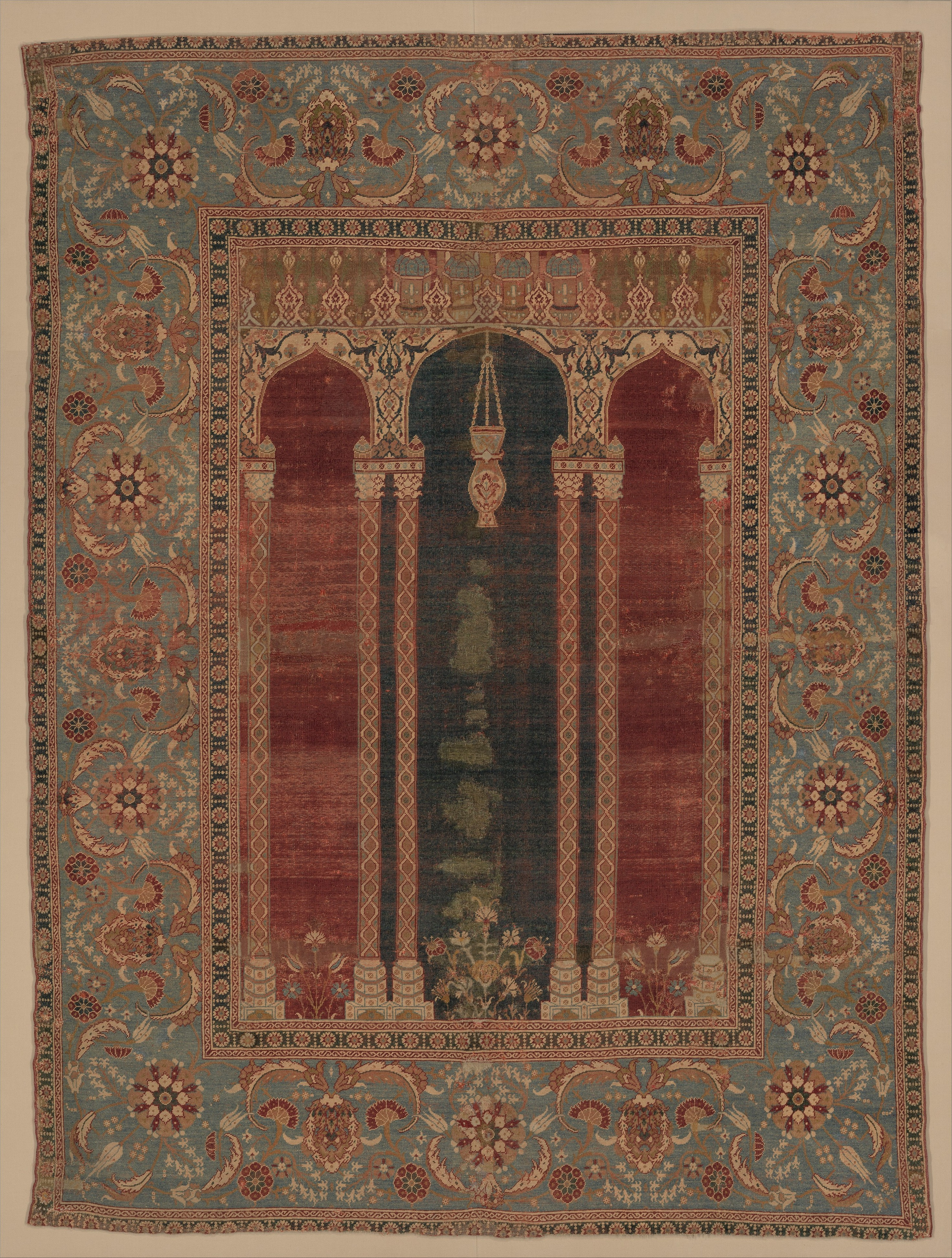
Ottoman court prayer rug, Bursa, late 16th century (James Ballard collection, Metropolitan Museum of Art)

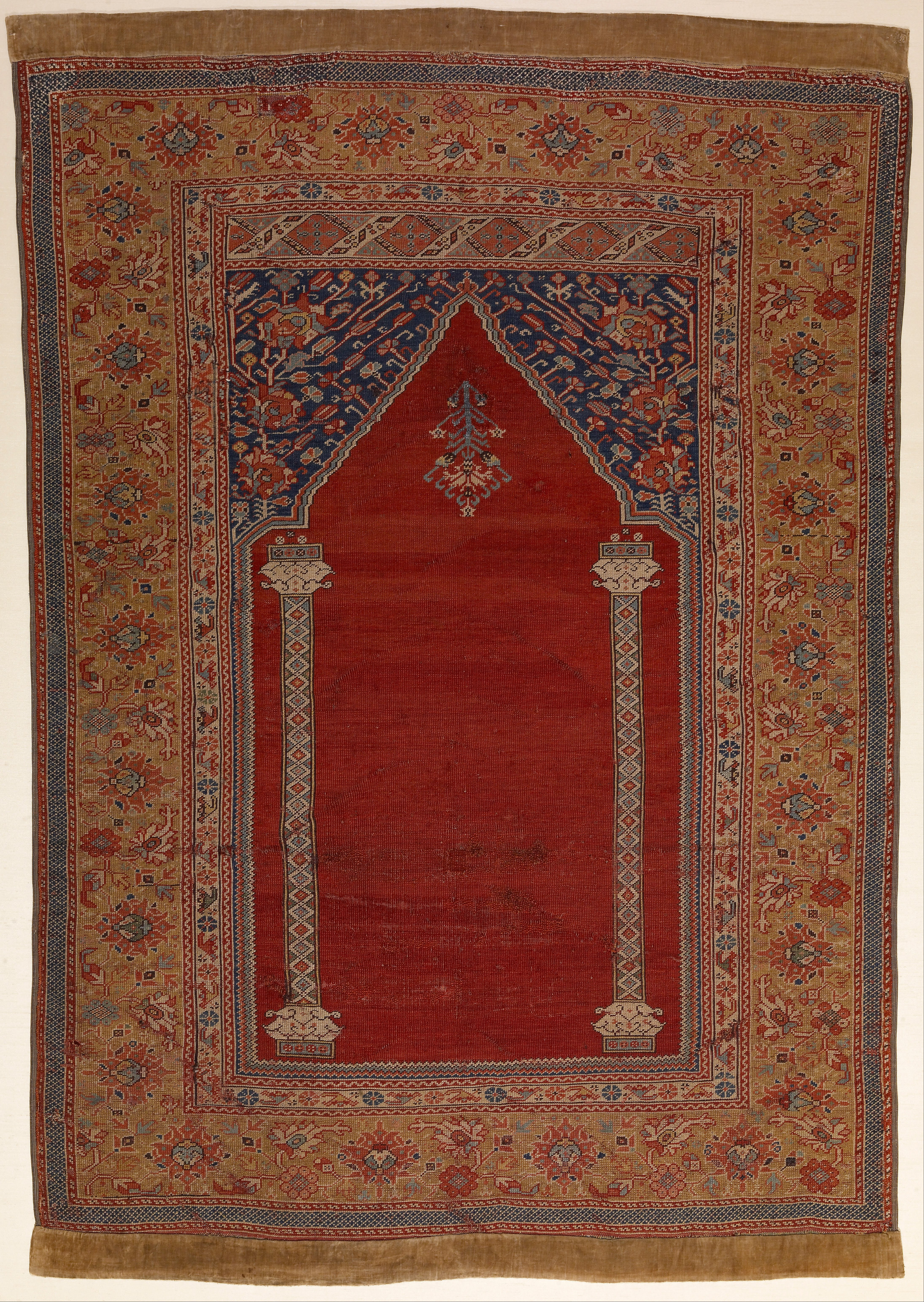
Turkish prayer rug

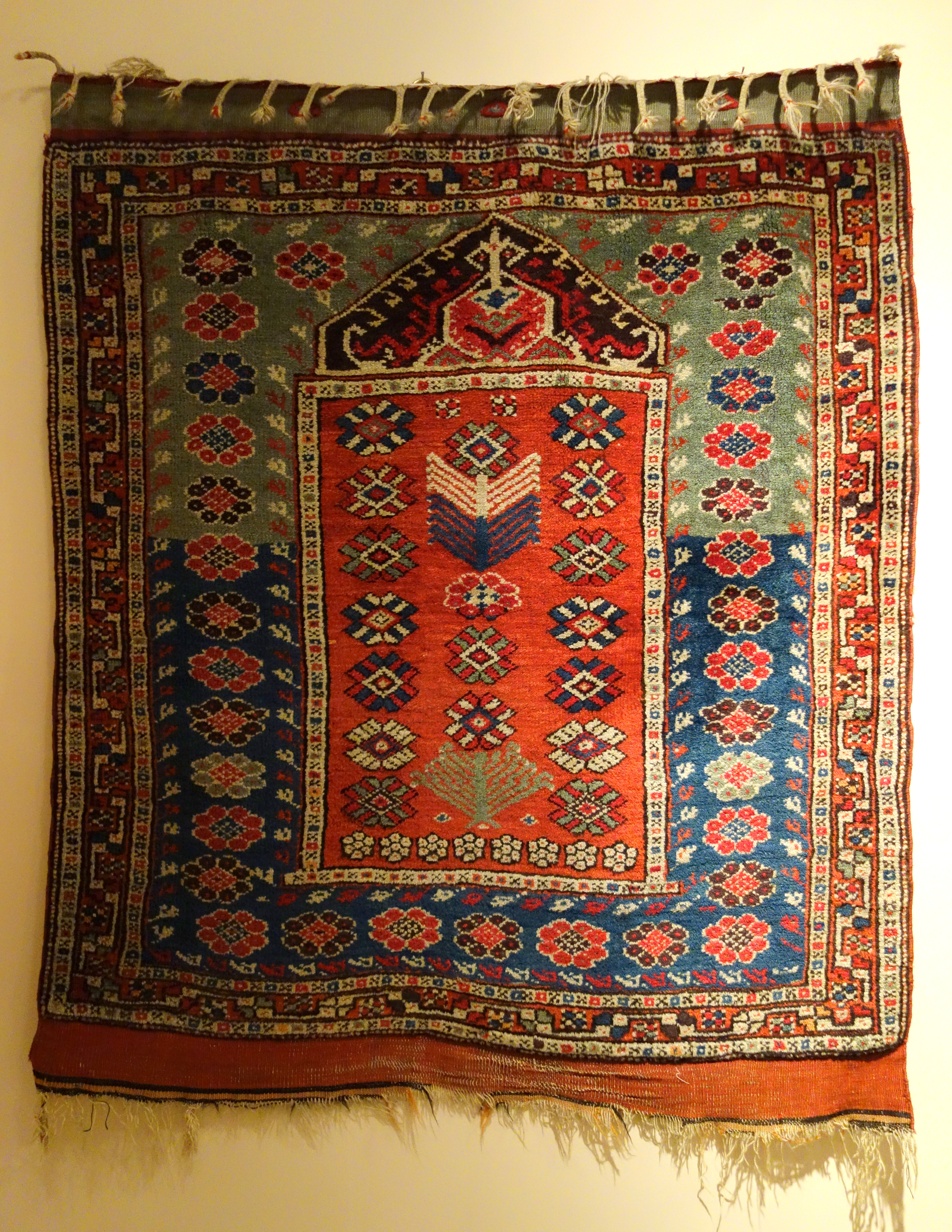
Bergama prayer rug, late 19th century

==== Nomadic and tribal production ====
With the end of the traditional nomadic lifestyle in Anatolia, and the consequent loss of specific traditions, it has become difficult to identify a genuine "nomadic rug". Social or ethnic groups known for their nomadic lifestyle like the Yürük or Kurds in contemporary Turkey have in large parts acquired sedentary lifestyles. Some aspects of the tradition, like the use of specific materials, dyes, weaving or finishing techniques or designs may have been preserved, which can be identified as specifically nomadic or tribal.

Criteria for a nomadic production include:

- Unusual materials like warps made of goat's hair, or camel wool in the pile;
- high quality wool with long pile (Anatolian and Turkmen nomads);
- small format fitting for a horizontal loom;
- irregular format due to frequent re-assembly of the loom, resulting in irregular tension of the warps;
- pronounced abrash (irregularities within the same colour due to dyeing of yarn in small batches);
- inclusion of flat weaves at the ends.

Within the genre of carpet weaving, the most authentic village and nomadic products were those woven to serve the needs of the community, which were not intended for export or trade other than local. This includes specialized bags and bolster covers (yastik) in Anatolia, which show designs adapted from the earliest weaving traditions.

== Regions ==
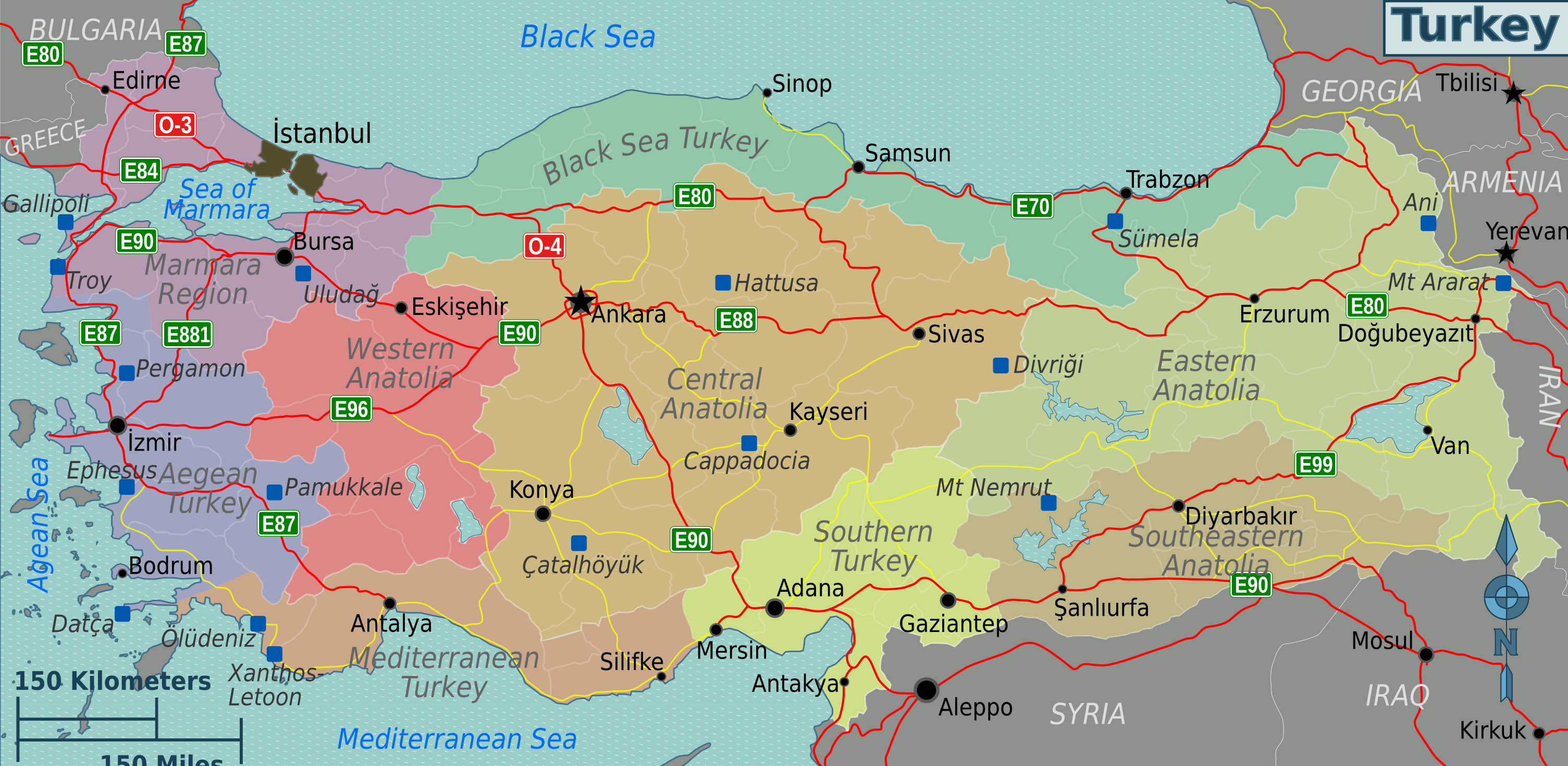
Regions of Turkey

Anatolia can be divided into three major areas of rug production, centered around local towns and marketplaces, which often lend their names to the rugs produced in the surrounding area. Western, Central, and Eastern Anatolia have distinct weaving traditions. However, commercially produced rugs are often woven irrespective of local design traditions. Preferential use of different materials and dyes, as well as characteristic designs, sometimes allow for a more specific assignment of a carpet to one of the three regions, or to a more specific weaving place.

=== Regional technical characteristics ===
	Western Anatolia	Central Anatolia	Eastern Anatolia
Warps	wool, white	wool, mostly white, sometimes brown	wool and goat hair, white and brown
Wefts	wool, dyed red, sometimes brown and white	wool, brown, white, dyed red or yellow	wool, mostly brown, sometimes dyed blue
Number of wefts	2-4 or more	2-4 or more	2-4 or more
Warp depression	none	sometimes	none
Selvages	wefts doubled back, mostly red, sometimes more colours	wefts doubled back, red, yellow, more colours	wefts doubled back, polychrome, "zipper"-like selvage technique
Ends	kilim, red, or polychrome stripes	kilim, red, yellow, polychrome	kilim, brown, red, blue, striped
Colours	cochineal red, blue, white accents	no cochineal red, yellow	cochineal red

=== Western Anatolia ===
As a group, Western Anatolian rugs often show a bright brick red and lighter reddish colours. White accents are prominent, and green and yellow are more frequently seen than in rugs from other regions of Anatolia. The wefts are often dyed red. The selvages are reinforced over 3-4 warp cords. The ends of the rug are often protected by flat weave kilims containing a small ornament woven in pile.

- Istanbul is the largest city of Turkey. During the nineteenth century, the court manufactories of Topkapı, Üsküdar, and Kum Kapı produced silk carpets in "Safavid-Osmanic" designs modelled on those of the sixteenth century, employing Armenian (from the areas of Kayseri and Sivas), and Persian weavers. Kum Kapı was, in the nineteenth century, the Armenian quarter of Istanbul. The asymmetrical knot was used. Silk carpets produced here often were woven with silver and gold threads. Two of the most prominent designer weavers were Zareh Penyamian and Tossounian. Zareh is known for his prayer rugs, which often included the "Sultan's head" form of the mihrab, cloud bands in the prayer field, palmettes and arabesque patterns and Quranic inscriptions. He often signed his carpets. Tossounian made silk rugs with high pile, glowing colours, and red kilim endings. The design was inspired by Persian animal carpets of the "Sanguszko" type. Colours are very elaborate, carmine red, jade green, yellow, and dark bright indigo.
- Hereke is a coastal town 60 kilometers from Istanbul on the bay of İzmit. A weaving workshop was established in 1843 by Sultan Abdülmecid I. Initially, the manufactory produced exclusively for the Ottoman court, which commissioned carpets for the Dolmabahçe Palace. Carpet production began in Hereke in 1891 and expert carpet weavers were brought in from the carpet weaving centers of Sivas, Manisa and Ladik. Hereke carpets are known primarily for their fine weave. Silk thread or fine wool yarn and occasionally gold, silver and cotton thread are used in their production. Hereke court carpets contain a wide variety of colours and designs. The medallion designs of earlier Ushak carpets was widely used at the Hereke factory. Once referring solely to carpets woven at Hereke, the term "Hereke carpet" is now used as a trade name for any high quality carpet woven with similar design.
- Bergama is the capital town of a district in the İzmir Province of northwest Turkey. As a market place for the surrounding villages, the name of Bergama is used as a trade name. The history of carpet weaving in Bergama probably dates back to the 11th century. Bergama carpets survived which date from the early 15th century. The best known carpet type woven for export which is attributed to the Bergama region is the so-called "large pattern Holbein Type", or Holbein Type III. A late descendant of the large-pattern Holbein design is often seen in Bergama carpets, called the "4+1" or "quincunxial" design, with a large square central medallion surrounded by four smaller squares placed at its corners. Also antique Anatolian carpets found in Transylvanian churches were likely woven in Bergama. Bergama rugs typically have large geometric patterns (the "Caucasian" type) or more floral patterns, stylized in rectilinear design (the "Turkish" type). They use typical Western Anatolian colour schemes with dark red and blue, and accents set in white. Bridal carpets ("Kiz Bergama") often show rosettes arranged in a lozenge pattern in their field panels. Village and peasant carpets from the Bergama area often show coarser knotting with bold, highly stylized designs and bright blue, red, and white colours in sharp contrast.
- The village of Kozak lies north of Bergama in the İzmir Province of northwest Turkey. By structure and colours they belong to the Bergama group. Small format rugs show geometrical designs, often adorned with latched hooks, which closely resembles Caucasian designs.
- Yagcibedir is not a town name, but a label for a carpet type woven in the Balıkesir province in the Marmara region. These carpets are characterized by their high knot density (100,000-140,000 per square meter), and subdued colours. They show geometrical patterns in dark red, brown, and black-blue. By their fine weaving, colours and design they resemble Caucasian designs, and are mainly woven by people of Circassian and Turkmen descent who migrated into this area.
- Çanakkale lies on the eastern shore of the Dardanelles near ancient Troy. Carpets are mainly woven in smaller villages to the south of Çanakkale. They show large squares, rhombi or polygons in their fields and strong colours like brick red, bright dark blue, saffron yellow and white. Ayvacık is a village south of Çanakkale and Ezine near the ruins of Assos and Troy. The carpets are of the Bergama type. Since 1981, the DOBAG initiative runs workshops in the small hamlets around Ayvacık, which produce rugs in traditional designs and with natural dyes. The initiative also has workshops in the Yuntdağ area near Bergama, where people of Turkmen descent weave robust, thick carpets in largely geometric designs. Floral or prayer rug designs are rare.
- The area between Balikesir and Eskisehir is inhabited mainly by a Turkish tribe called Karakecili. The rugs are often smaller, with cheerful bright red, light blue, white and pale green. The use of goats's hair for the warps hints at the nomadic origins of the tribe. The design is geometric, often combined with stylized floral motifs. The borders sometimes contain rows of lozenges, as also seen in more elaborate form in "Transylvanian" carpets.
- Bandırma is the capital town of the province to which it has given its name. The town lies on the Marmara coast. Since the nineteenth century, intricately woven carpets are produced mainly in prayer rug design. The cotton foundation and finely knotted pile of wool and silk characterizes the Bandırma carpet as a product of town manufacture. Production declined during the late nineteenth century, with inferior or artificial silk and mercerized cotton being used. The name of the town and region is nowadays often used for cheap imitations sold by other manufacturers.
- Gördes lies about 100 km north-east of İzmir. Carpets were already produced there in the 16th century. Their largely floral, stylized patterns can be traced back to Ottoman floral designs of the sixteenth and seventeenth century. The main border is often composed of rows of three pomegranates, arranged like flowers in groups of three, held together by their stems. Typical is also a broad border of seven stripes (sobokli). Gördes is mostly famous for its bridal and prayer carpets. The shapes of the mihrab niches vary from simple stepped arches to artistic architectural pillars, with a horizontal rectangular crossbar above the mihrab niche. Typical colours are cherry red, pastel pink, blue and green together with dark indigo blue. Early carpets of the Gördes type have a more lively colour. Since the 19th century, some pieces show spacious accents in white cotton, and the colours, overall, become more subdued.
- Kula is the capital town of the Manisa Province, and lies about 100 km east of İzmir on the road to Ușak. Together with Ușak, Gördes, Lâdik and Bergama it belongs to the most important rug weaving centers of Anatolia. Prayer rug designs are common, with straight-lined mihrab niches. Another specific design is called "mazarlik", or graveyard design, which is a subtype of the garden design. The particularly gloomy yet brilliant colour scheme caused one type of rugs from this area to be called "Kömürcü ("charcoal burner") Kula". A combination with predominantly yellow borders is characteristic for Kula carpets. Unusual for Anatolian, and even for Oriental rugs, the rug type called "Kendirli" Kula makes use of hemp in its foundation. A number of "Transylvanian" rugs are attributed to the Kula area.
- Uşak lies north of Denizli in the Aegean Region. It is one of the most renowned and important carpet centres. According to their structure and patterns there are several types of carpets called "star", "medallion" and "white-ground" Ușak carpets. Frequently depicted by European painters during the Renaissance era, they are often given, as a term of convenience, the name of the painter on whose paintings corresponding carpets have been identified. The best known are Holbein and Lotto carpets.
- Smyrna carpets are woven in the surrounding of the town today known as İzmir. Their more elaborate, curvilinear "town designs" distinguish Smyrna carpets from the products of other Anatolian centers. Single ornaments are directly related to Ottoman "court" carpets. In particular, the main borders often contain elongated cartouches like those seen in "Transylvanian" carpets.
- Milas lies on the south-western coast of the Aegean Region. Since the 18th century, predominantly carpets with a "prayer rug" design and characteristic "gathered" mihrabs are woven here. Other types include the Ada (island) Milas rugs from the area of Karaova, with vertically twisted polygons in their fields, and the rare medallion Milas rug with a mostly yellow-gold medallion on a red background. Their borders often show crystalline star shaped ornaments composed by arrow-like ornaments pointing towards the center. Similar designs are also found in Caucasian carpets. Commonly used colours include pale violet, warm yellow, and pale green. The field panel ground is often a brick red.
- Megri lies on the Turkish south coast, opposite the island of Rhodes. In 1923, it was renamed Fethiye. Megri rugs often show a division of the inner field into three different long fields, with floral patterns inscribed. Prayer rug designs with stepped gable bands are also seen. Typical colours are yellow, bright red, light and dark blue, and white. Megri rugs are also sold under the name of Milas, and it is sometimes difficult to differentiate these two products of town manufacture.
- Isparta in Pisidia emerged as a new centre of Anatolian rug production in the late 1880s. The city, until then renowned for its rose production, developed into a competitive carpet weaving centre with significant export activity. A major role in this development was played by the Oriental Carpet Manufacturers one of the largest companies active in this field, which bought the carpets on a monopoly based system, whereas it also provided the weavers with primary material, such as dyed yarns, and with technical assistance, namely specialized personnel who could improve the processes and final products. Isparta carpets came in a standard quality, which enhanced their commercial value and demand. Their main feature was the cotton weft and the use of asymmetric knots. Many of them belonged to the prayer-rug type, with triangular patterns which remind of a mihrab. The Isparta type rug, considered by Kahramanos, a standardized product of the 19th century, is woven with double-stranded yarns and in a smaller number of knots; their initial patterns were imitating popular Asia Minor styles, particularly those of Usak, with a central medallion, decorated corners and lively colours. Soon, they turned to following Persian style, which proved much more popular in the western markets, particularly that of the United States. Later, in the 1920s and 1930s they followed Sarouk patterns. Initially yarns were dyed with natural, plant-based dyes, but soon, as elsewhere, they changed to chemically dyed yarns. The original wool on wool fabric was replaced by a combination of lamb's wool for the weft and cotton or linen for the warp. Carpet production in Isparta followed the technologically innovative solutions of that time such as the aforementioned replacement of natural dyes by chemical ones, which were cheaper. The chemically prepared anilines used at first were proved to be inconsistent, but soon chemistry provided new synthetic dyes with steady and standardized colours; this made the reproduction of the same pattern over and over again possible. The use of millimetric paper for designing the patterns allowed workers to reproduce patterns exactly in all their details. Isparta carpet weaving suffered a severe blow after the expulsion of the Greek Orthodox population in 1922, however Isparta remained a centre for washing and finishing carpets until today.

=== Central Anatolia ===
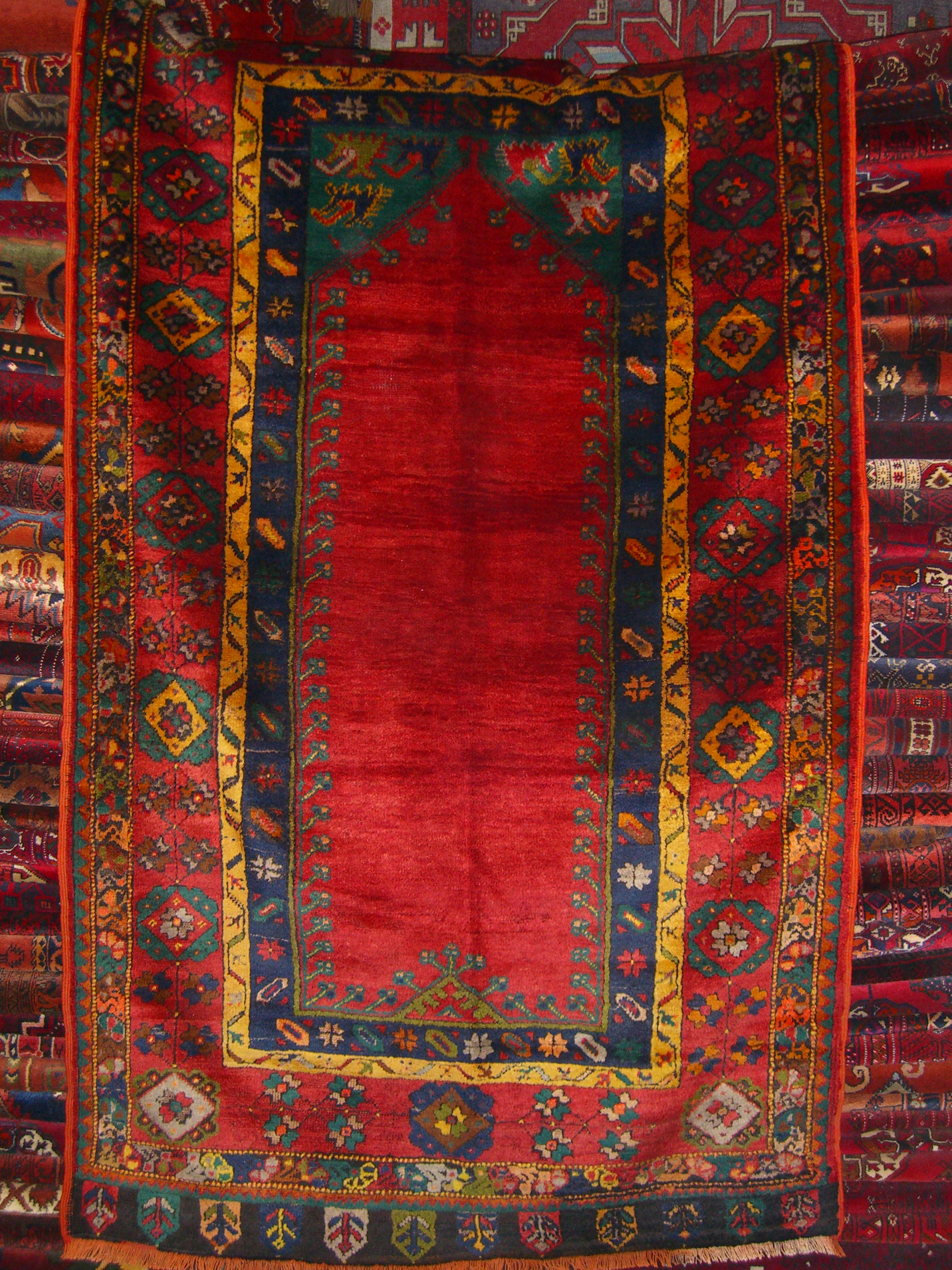
Old Anatolian Konya Prayer Rug

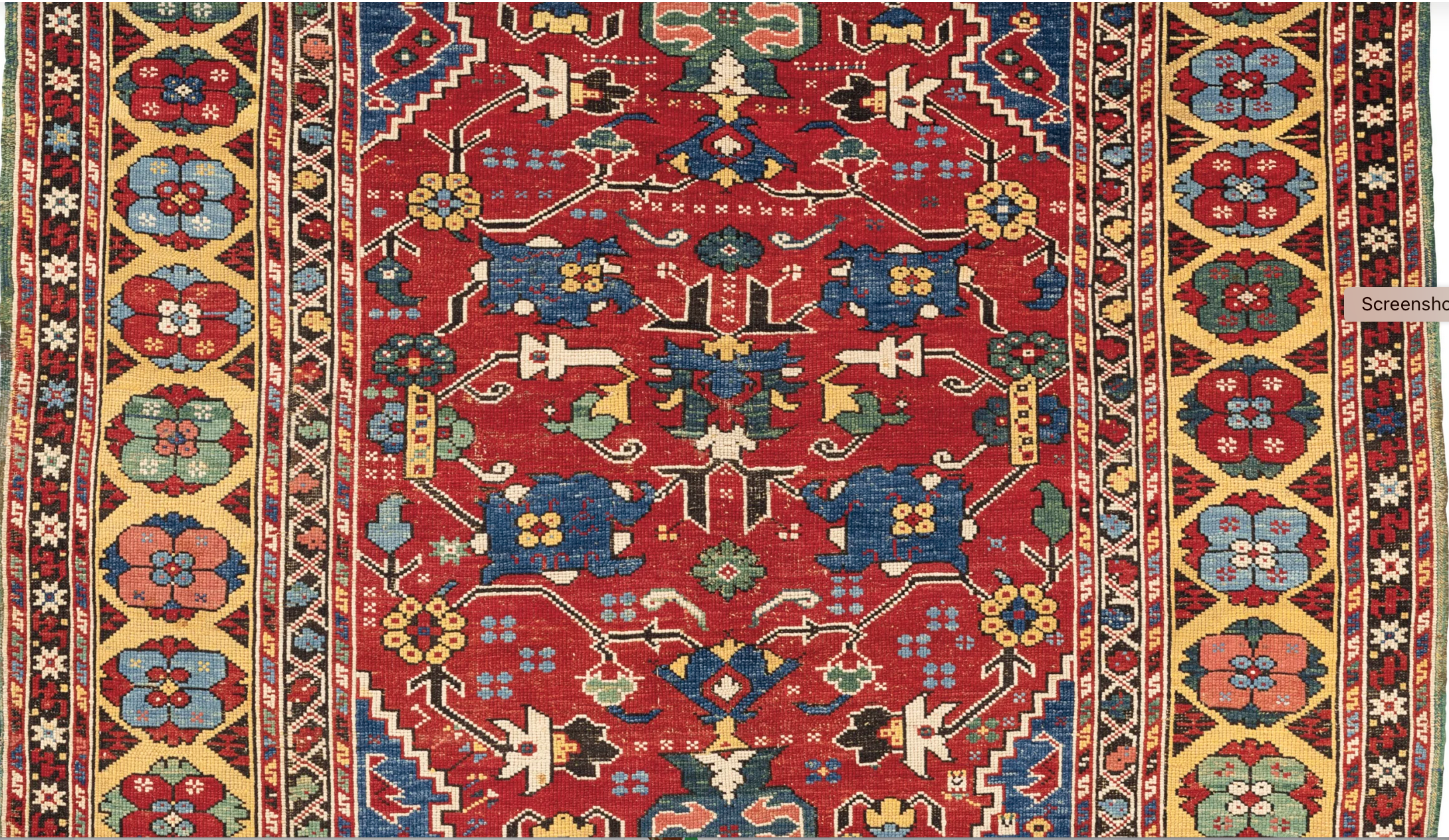
Central Anatolian double-niche rug (detail), 18th century, auctioned in 2021

Central Anatolia is one of the main areas of carpet production in Turkey. Regional weaving centers with distinct designs and traditions are:

- Konya (Konya, Konya-Derbent, Selçuk, Keçimuslu, Ladik, Innice, Obruk)

The town of Konya is the old capital of the Seljuq Empire. The Mevlana Museum in Konya has a large collection of Anatolian rugs, including some of the carpet fragments found in the Alaeddin and Eşrefoğlu Mosque. Carpets from the Konya manufacture often show an elaborate prayer rug design, with a monochrome bright madder red field. Carpets from Konya-Derbent often have two floral medallions woven into the field below the mihrab. The Konya-Selçuk carpet tradition makes use of a lean octagonal medallion in the middle of the field, with three opposed geometrical forms crowned by tulips. Also typical is a broad ornamental main border with detailed, filigree patterns flanked by two secondary borders with meandering vines and flowers. Rugs from Keçimuslu are often sold as Konya rugs, and show a similar bright madder red field, but with prominent green colours in the main border.

Konya-Ladik rugs often show prayer rug designs. Their fields are mostly in bright madder red, with stepped mihrab designs. Opposite, and sometimes above, the prayer niche are smaller gables. The gables are often arranged in groups of three, each gable decorated with a stylized, geometric tulip ornament. The tulips are frequently shown upside down at the lower end of the prayer niche. The spandrels are often in golden yellow, and show water ewer ornaments. The "Ladik sinekli" design is also specific for Ladik. On a white or cream white field, a multitude of small black ornaments is arranged, which resemble flies (Turk.: "sinek"). Innice rugs resemble Ladik rugs in their use of tulip ornaments, the bold red field complemented by the bright green foundation of the spandrels. Obruk rugs show the typical Konya design and colours, but their ornaments are more bold and stylized, resembling the Yürük traditions of the weavers from this village. Obruk rugs are sometimes also sold in Kayseri.

- Kayseri (Kayseri, Avanos, Ürgüp, Kırşehir, Mucur, Ortaköy, İncesu)

Kayseri rugs are distinguished by their fine weaving which characterizes the manufactory production, which is prevalent in this area. The rugs are produced mainly for export, and imitate designs from other regions. Wool, silk, and artificial silk are used. The top products of the Kayseri manufactures come very close to those from Hereke and Kum-Kapı. Ürgüp, Avanos and İncesu are Cappadocian towns.

Carpets from Avanos, often in prayer rug design, are distinguished by their dense weaving. Typically, an elaborate pendant representing either a Mosque lamp or a triangular protective amulet ("mosca") hanging from the prayer niche adorns the field. The prayer niches are often stepped, or drawn in at its sides in the classical "head-and-shoulders" shape. The field is often in bright red, and surrounded by golden yellow spandrels and borders. The fine weaving allows for elaborate ornamental patterns, which make the Avanos carpet easy to identify amongst other rugs.

Ürgüp carpets are distinguished by their colours. Brown-gold is dominant, bright orange and yellow are often seen. A medallion within a medallion frequently is set into the field, which is of a typical "Ürgüp red" colour, adorned with floral motifs. Palmettes fill the corner medallions and the main borders. The outermost secondary border often has reciprocal crenellations.

Rugs from Kırşehir, Mucur and Ortaköy are closely related, and not easily distinguished from each other. Prayer and medallion designs are woven, as well as garden ("mazarlik", or "graveyard") designs. Pale turquois blue, pale green and rose colours are prevalent. Rugs from Ortaköy show a hexagonal central ornament, often including a cruciform pattern. The borders show stylized carnations arranged in a row of square compartments. Mucur carpets often show a stepped "prayer niche within a prayer niche" design, with contrasting bright madder red and light indigo colours separated by yellow outlines. The borders are composed of rows of squares filled with geometric diamond or rhomboid patterns. Mucur and Kırşehir are also known for their multiple-niche prayer rugs, or "saph".

- Niğde (Niğde, Taşpınar, Fertek, Maden, Yahyalı, Yeşilhisar, Karapinar, Karaman)

Niğde is the market place for the surrounding area, and many rugs woven in the surrounding villages are sold under the trade name of Niğde. If a prayer rug design is used, the niche and spandrels are typically tall and narrow. Likewise, the central field is not substantially larger than the main border. Typical for Taşpınar are elongated, almost ogival central medallions, the dominant colours are warm red, blue, and light green. Fertek rugs are distinguished by their simple, floral ornaments. The main field is often not separated from the main border, as usual, by a smaller secondary border. The outermost secondary border often has reciprocal crenellation patterns. The colour composition often contains soft reds, dark olive greens, and blue. Maden rugs used cochineal red for their main fields, which are narrow and slim, as typical for Niğde rugs. The foundation of their main border is often dyed in corrosive brown, which caused deterioration of the carpet pile in these areas, and produces a relief effect. Yahali is a regional center and market place for its surroundings. Carpets from this region often have a hexagonal central medallion, with double-hooked ornaments in the fields and carnations in the main border.

Carpets from Karapinar and Karaman geographically belong to the Konya area, but their design is more similar to the rugs woven in the Niğde area. The design of some Karapinar rugs shows similarities, but is not related, to Turkmen door rugs ("ensi"), as three columns crowned by double hooks ("kotchak") frequently form the prayer niche. Opposed "double hook" ornaments fill the columns both in Karapinar and Karaman rugs. Another type of design often seen in Karapinar runners is composed of geometric hexagonal primary motifs arranged on top of each other, in subdued red, yellow, green, and white.

- Sivas (Sivas, Zara, Kangal)

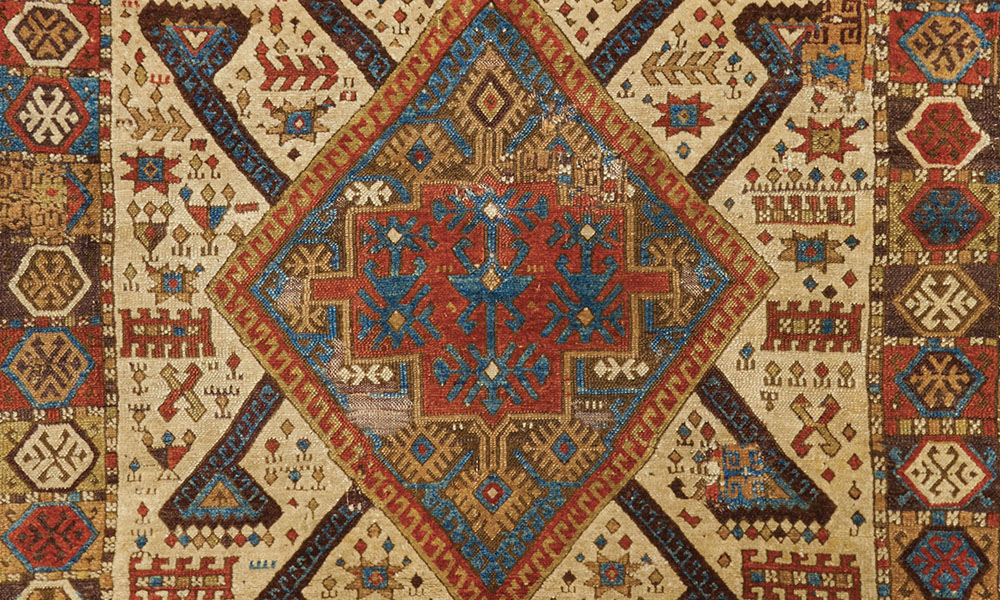
East Anatolian rug (detail), Şarkişla-Sivas region, ca. 1800 AD

State-owned manufactories, some of them organized as weaving schools, produce rugs in Sivas. The design imitates carpets from other regions, especially Persian designs. Traditional Sivas carpets were distinguished by their dense and short, velvet-like pile in elaborate designs which are characteristic for a "town manufactory". The main border is typically composed of rows of three carnations, held together by a stem. Zara, 70 km east of Sivas, has an Armenian colony which produces rugs in a characteristic design composed of row after row of vertical stripes extending over the entire field. Each stripe is filled with elaborate floral arabesques. The pile is clipped very short so that the detailed patterns can be clearly seen.

=== Eastern Anatolia ===
We are currently unable to recognize specific local designs in east Anatolian carpets. Until the Armenian genocide in 1915, East Anatolia had a large Armenian population, and sometimes carpets are identified as of Armenian production by their inscriptions. Information is also lacking with regard to the Kurdish and Turkish carpet production. Research in the 1980s has come to the conclusion that the tradition of weaving has almost vanished, and more specific information may be lost.

- Kars is the capital of Kars Province in northeastern Anatolia. Carpets produced around the town are similar to Caucasian rugs, with their colours more subdued. Kars is also used as a trade name, related to the quality of the weaving. Carpets of lower quality woven in the Kars region are sometimes called "Hudut" (i.e., frontier) carpets, which are woven in the frontier area between Turkey, Iran, Armenia and Georgia. Typical designs closely resemble the neighbouring Caucasian regions. Kars rugs often show "Kasak" designs as seen in Fachralo, Gendje, and Akstafa rugs, but their structure and materials are different. Kars or Hudut rugs often have goat's hair in pile and foundation.

Other East Anatolian rugs are usually not attributed to a specific location, but are classified according to their tribal provenience. As the Kurdish and Yürük tribes were living as nomads for most of their history, they tended to weave traditional tribal, rather than any local, design. If a rug with an overall Yürük design can be attributed to a specific region (as Yürüks also live in other regions of Anatolia), the name "Yürük" sometimes precedes the regional name. The region around the towns of Diyarbakır, Hakkâri, and the Van province has a large Kurdish population. The towns of Hakkâri and Erzurum were market places for Kurdish kilims, rugs and smaller weavings like cradles, bags (heybe) and tent decorations.

== Thematic galleries ==
=== Patterns of Central Asian origin: cloud band, lotus seat, cloud collar ===
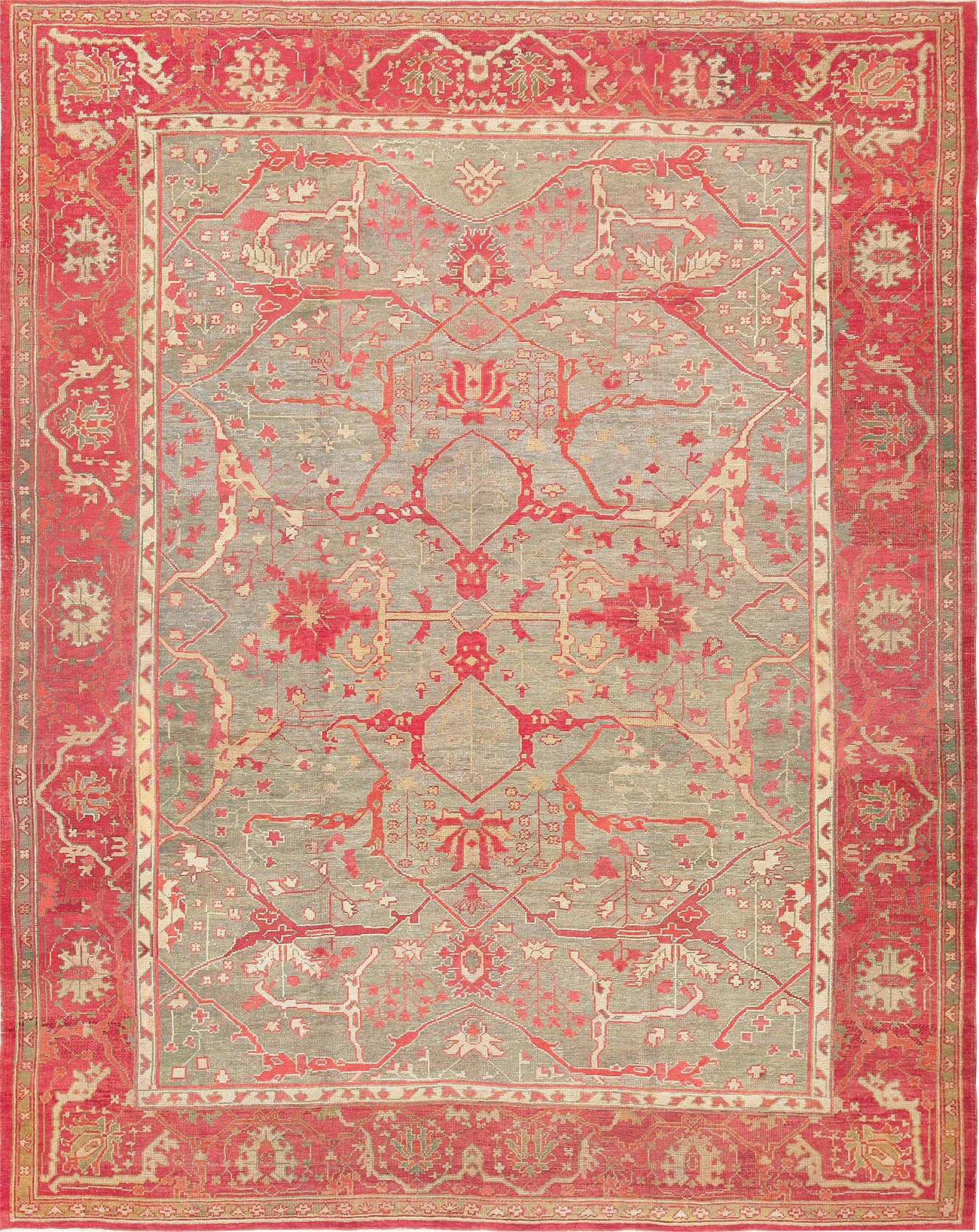
Ushak carpet with a "cloud band" border and field, Mecidi period design

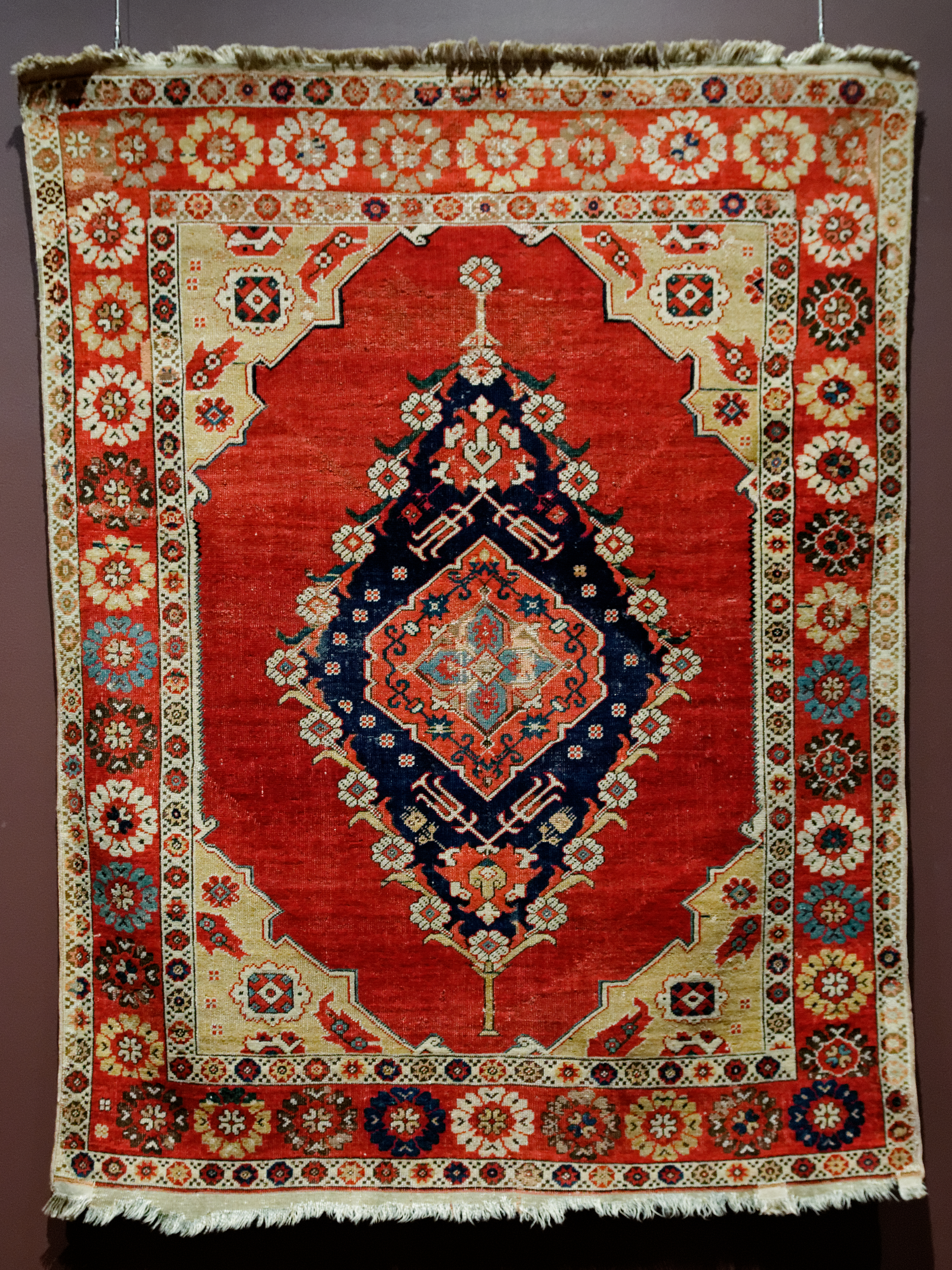
"Transylvanian" double-niche carpet with a central medallion

=== Patterns of Islamic origin: Calligraphic borders, infinite repeat field, prayer niche design ===
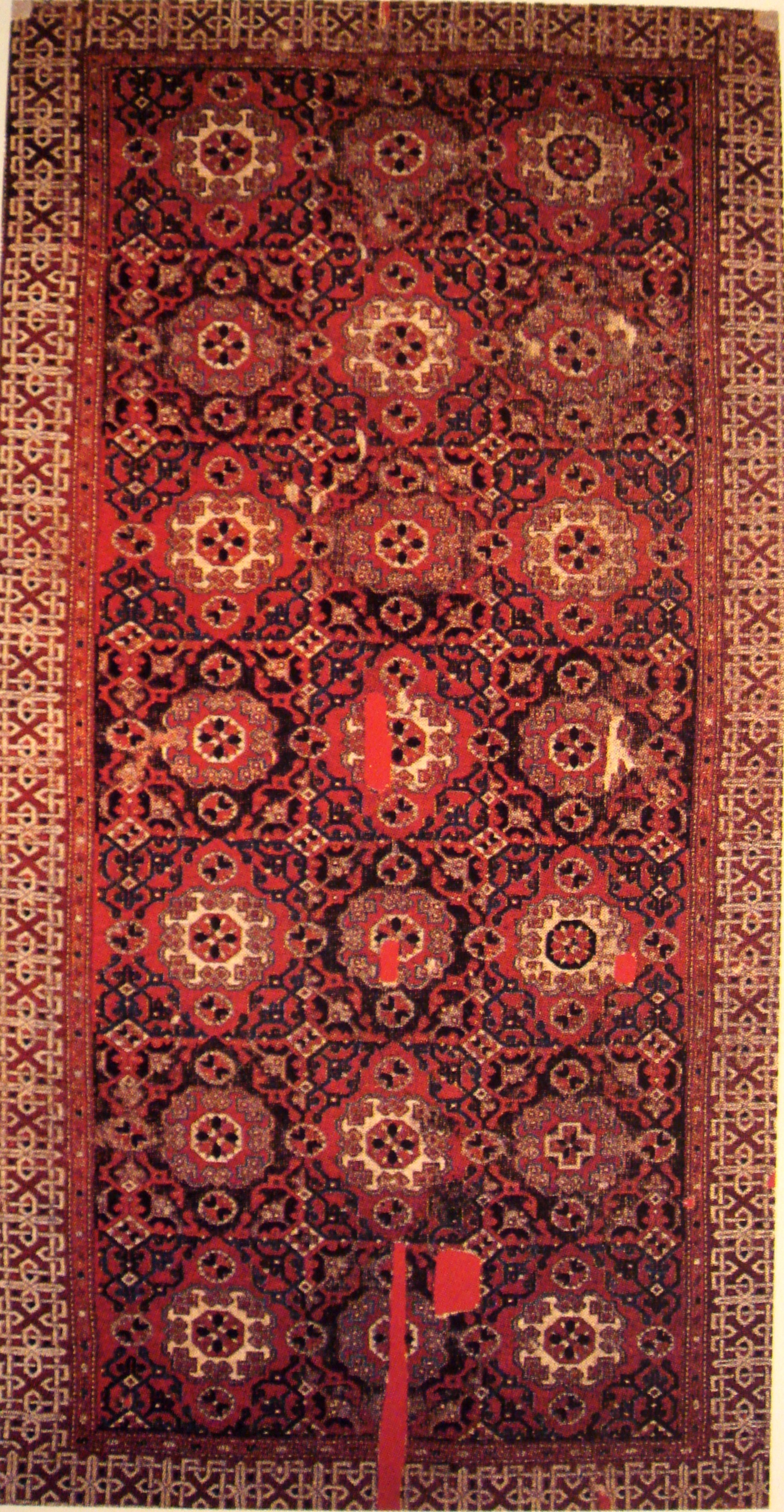
Type I small-pattern Holbein carpet with "kufic" main border and "infinite repeat" field pattern, Anatolia, 16th century.

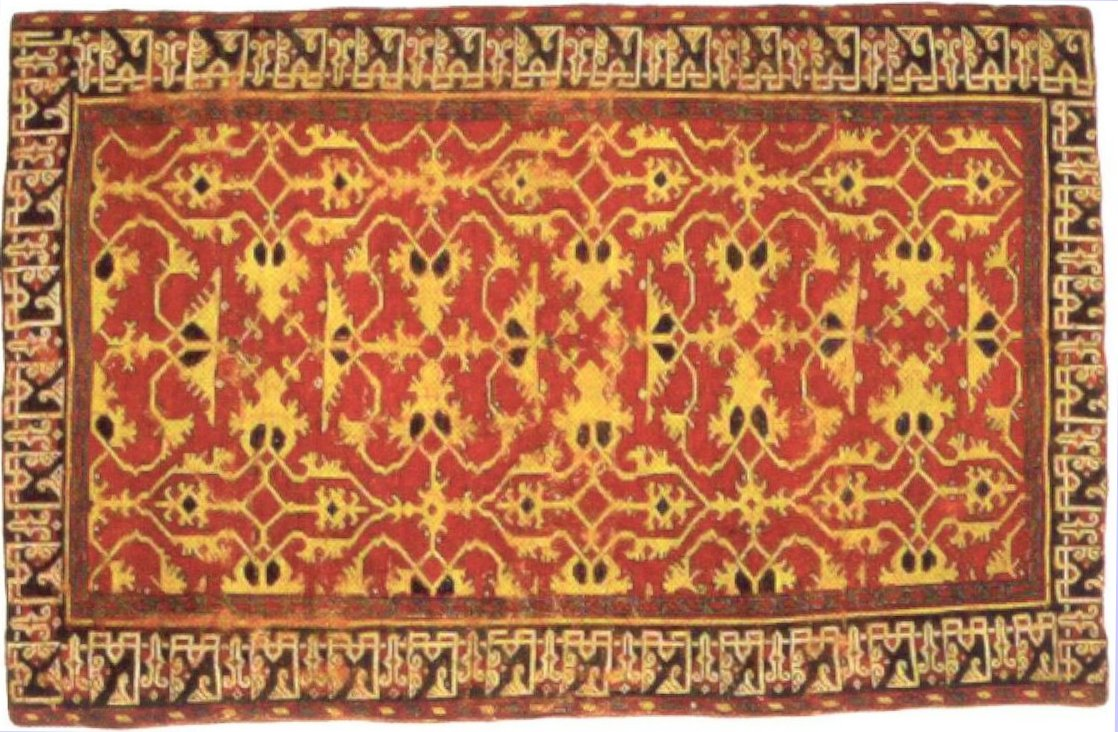
Western Anatolian ‘Lotto carpet’ with "kufic" main border and "infinite repeat" field pattern, 16th century, Saint Louis Art Museum.

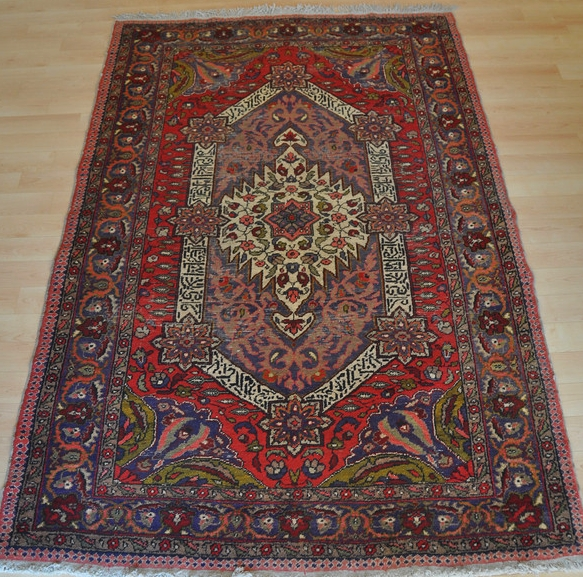
Urgup rug with "kufic" inner border

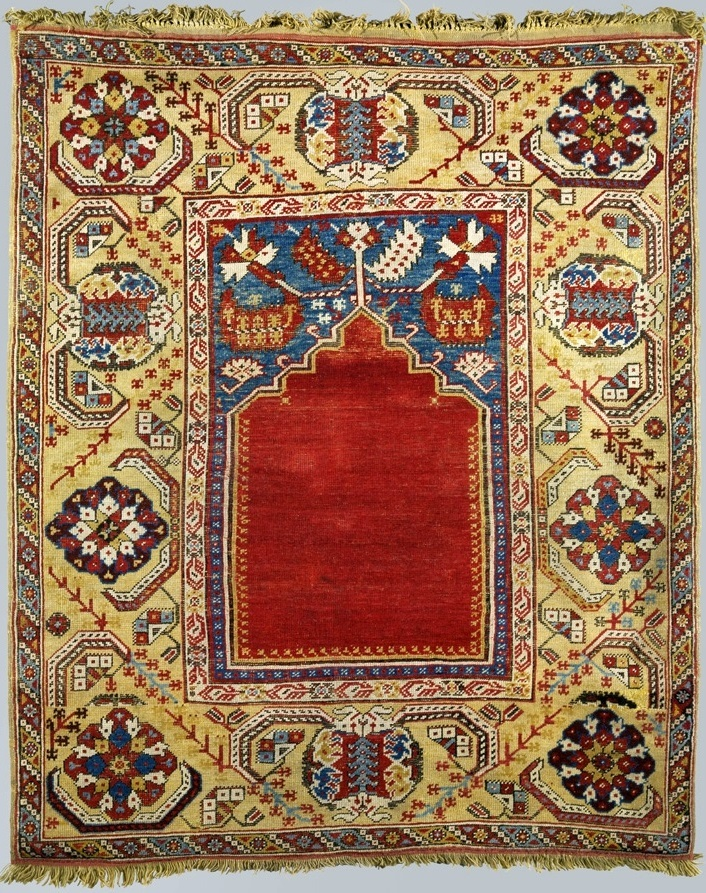
17th-century Turkish prayer rug with a single niche; National Museum, Warsaw

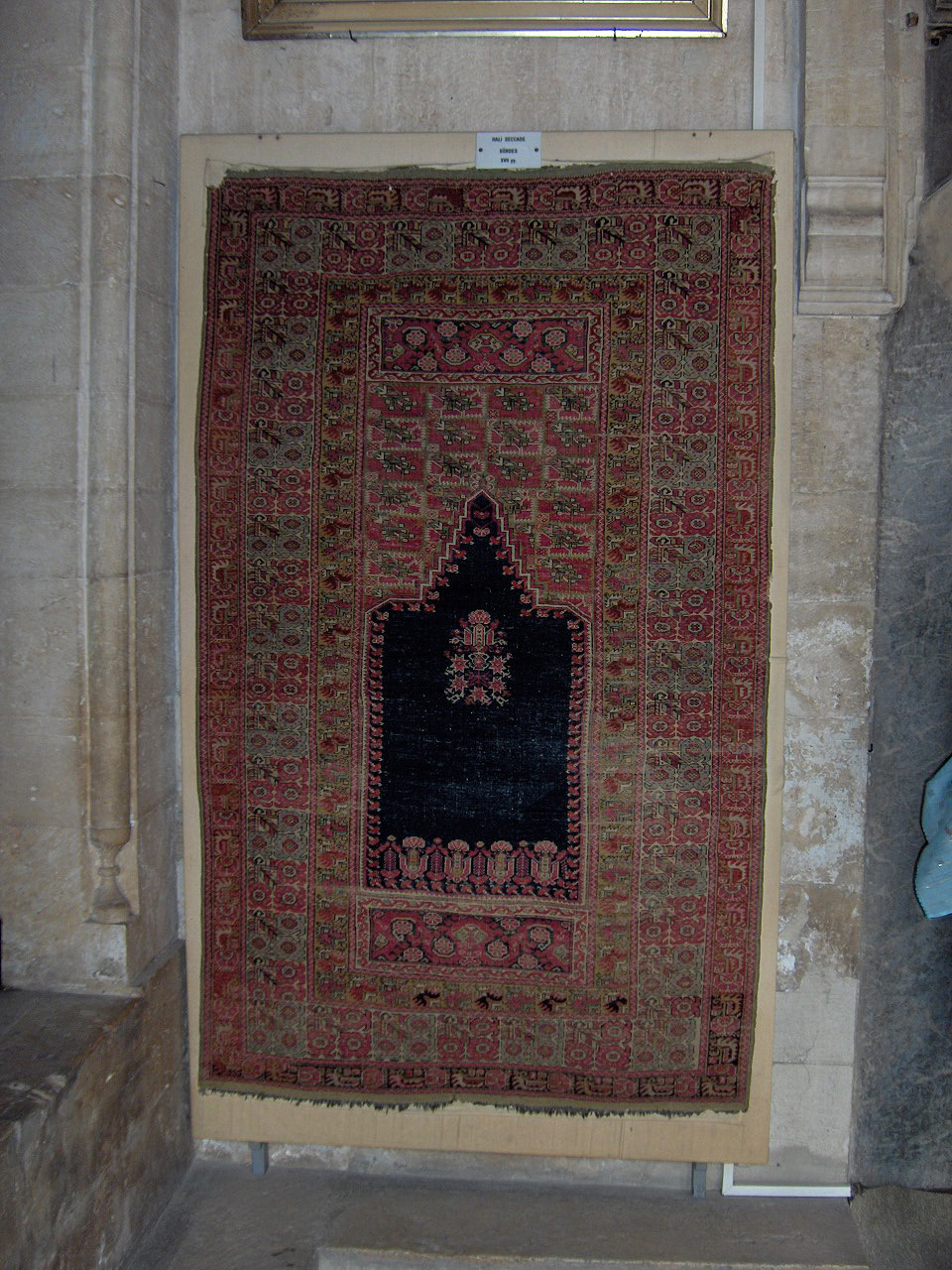
Kirşehir single niche prayer rug, Tilavet room, Mevlâna Mausoleum, Konya

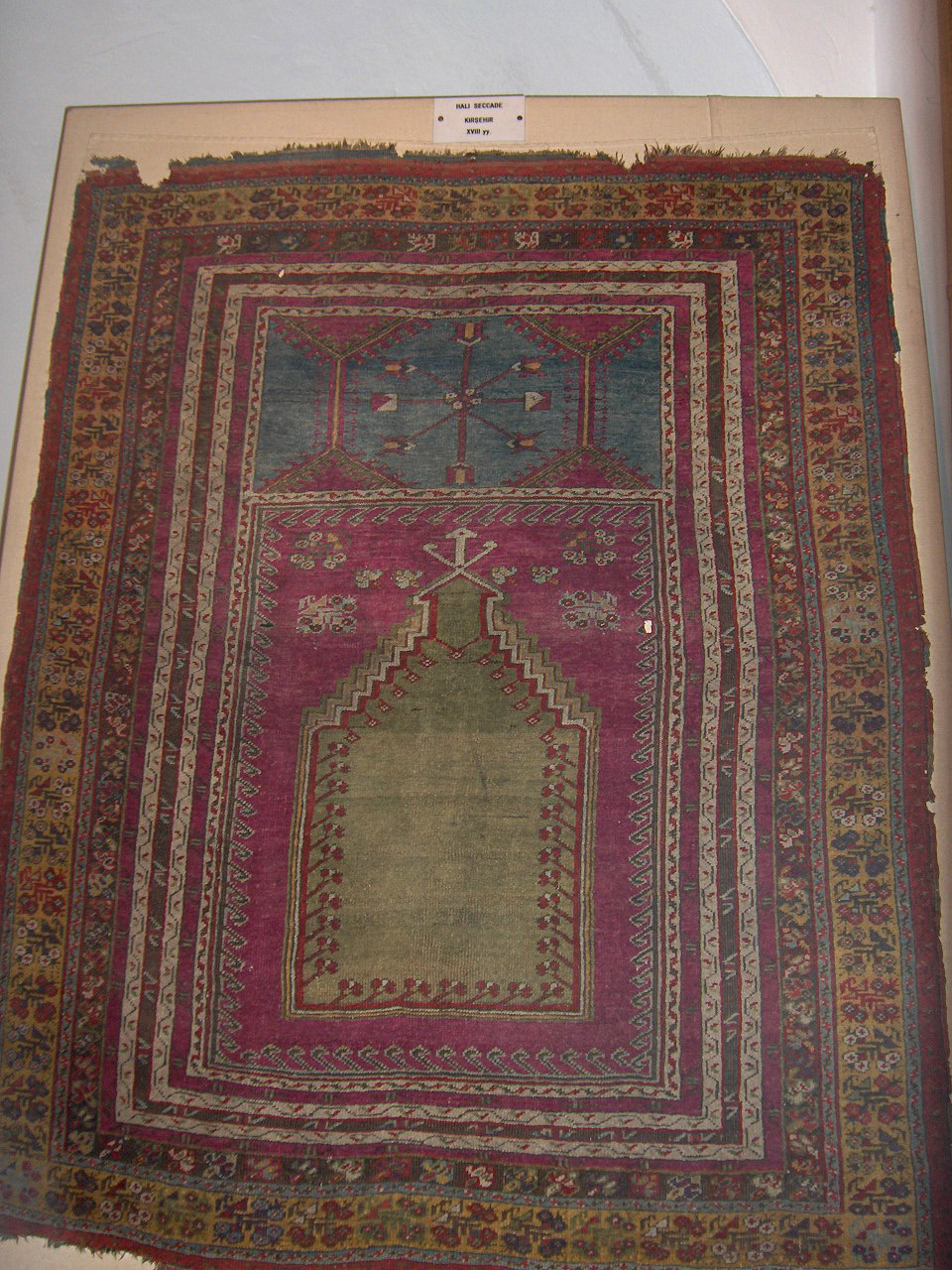
Kirşehir single niche prayer rug, 18th century, Mevlâna Mausoleum, Konya

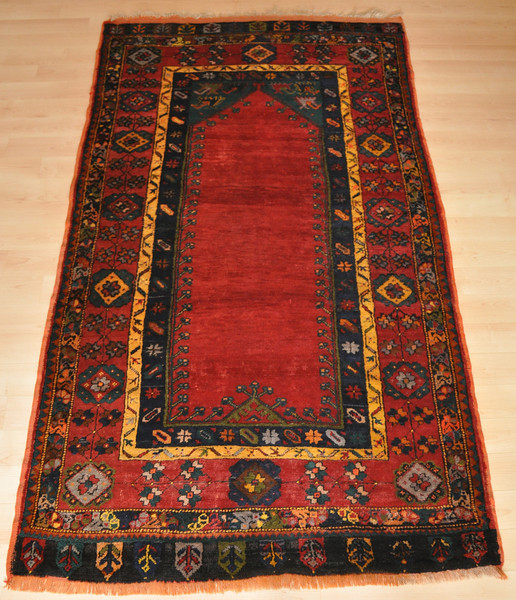
Konya single niche prayer rug

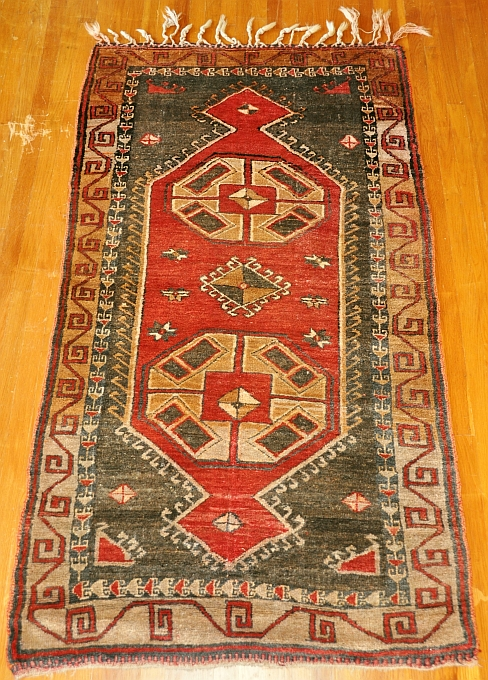
Gaziantep double-niche prayer rug

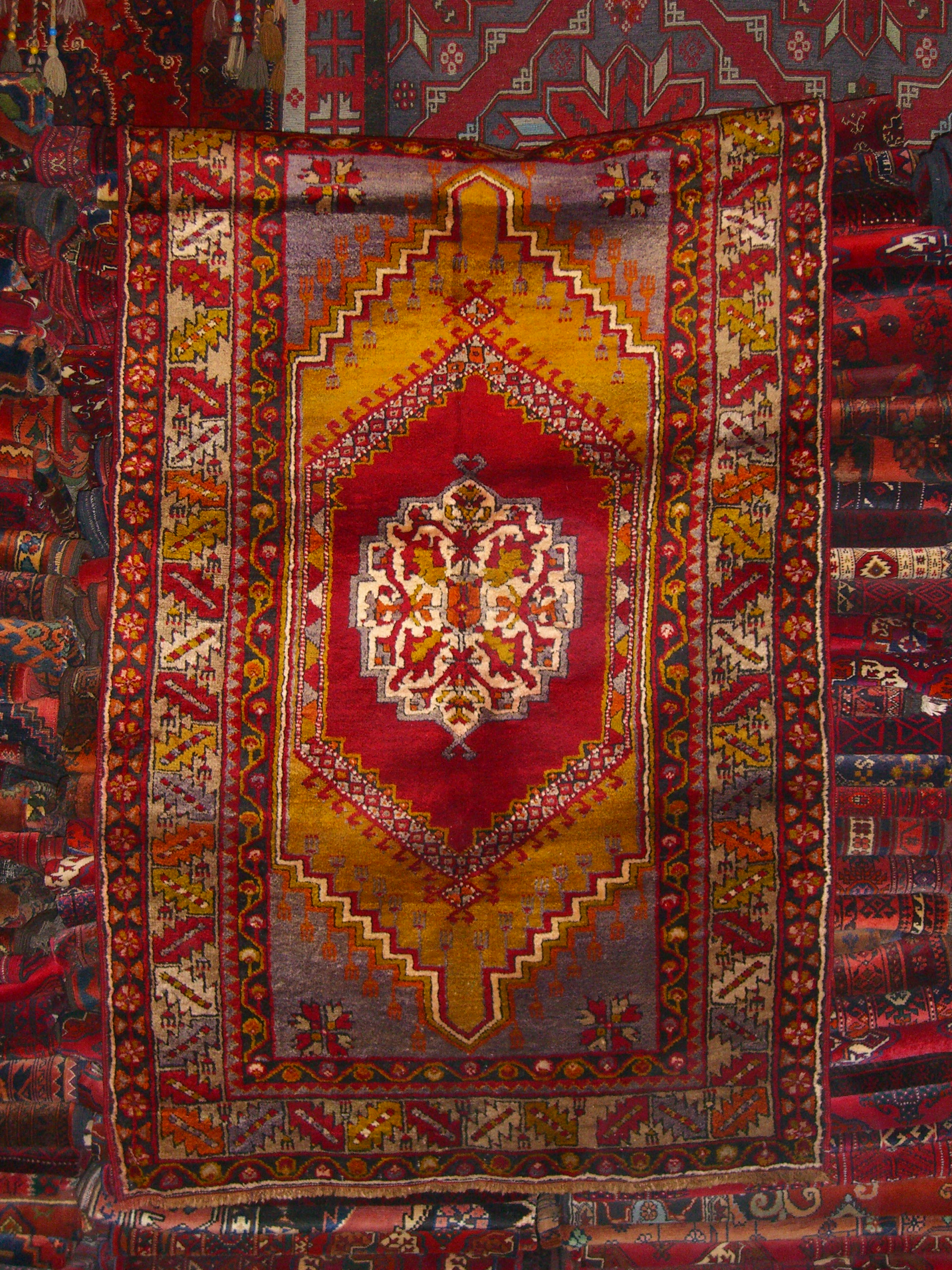
Central Anatolian double-niche prayer rug

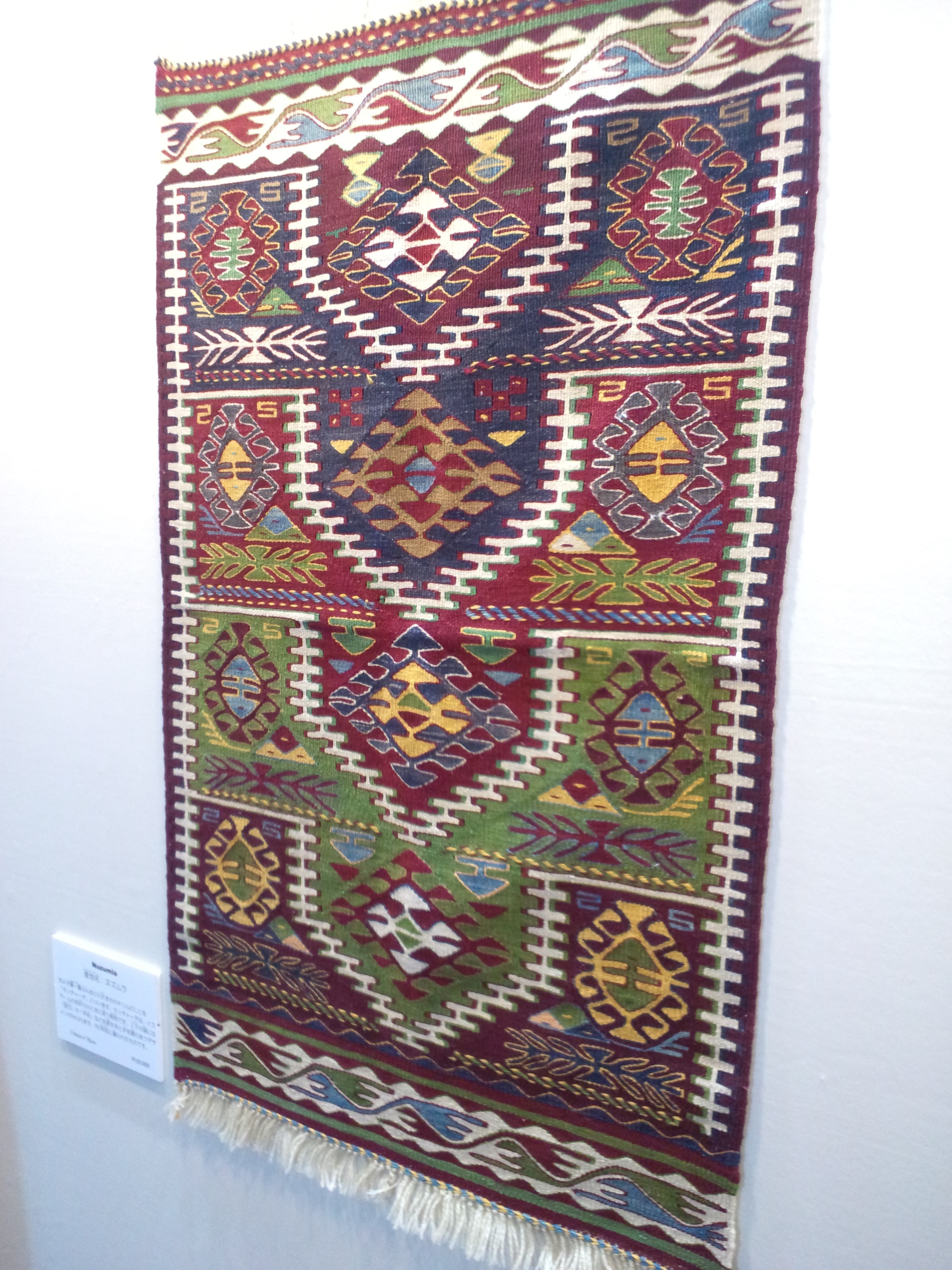
Prayer rug with multiplied niches

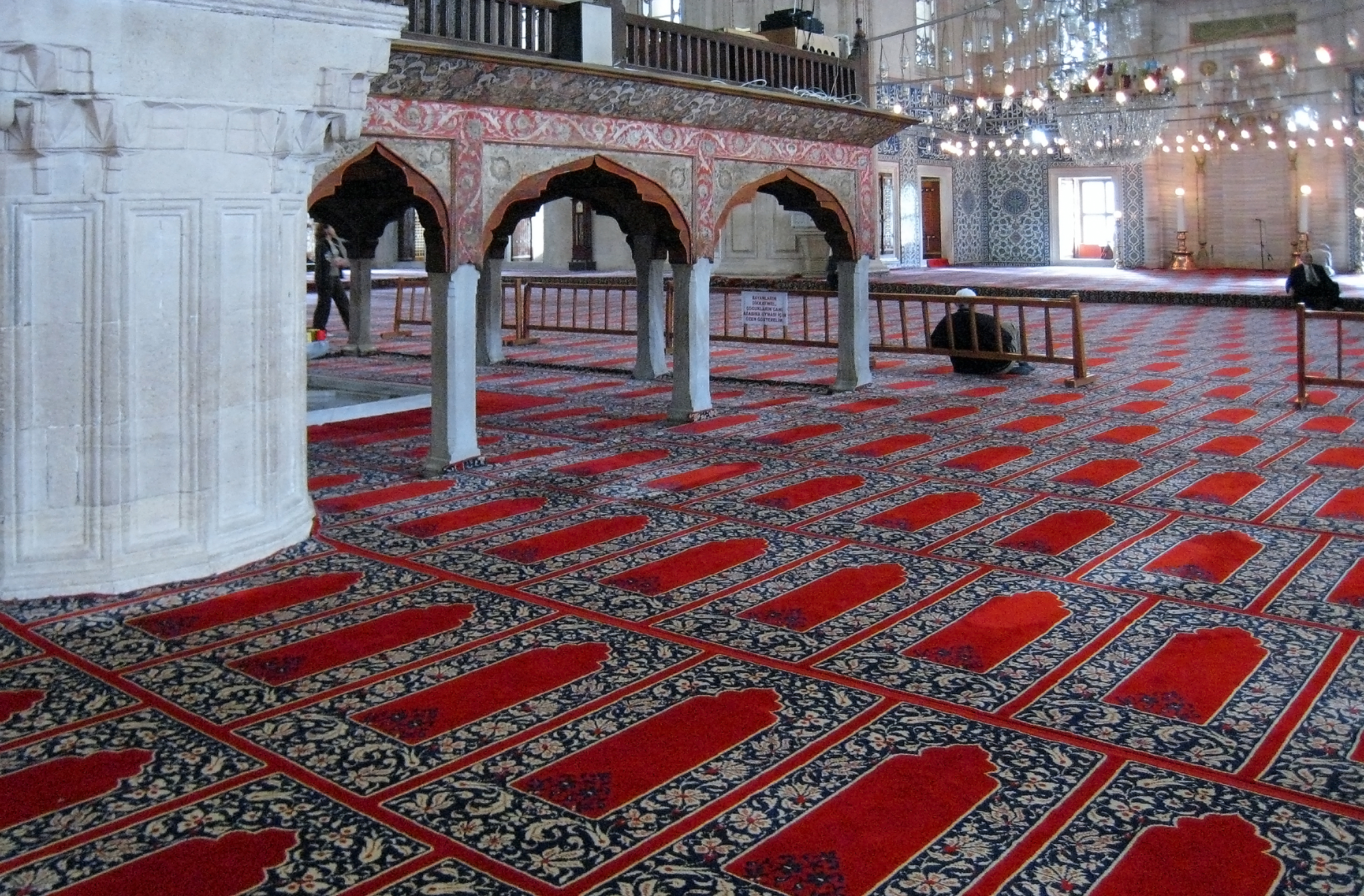
Edirne Selimiye Mosque interior with multiple-niche prayer rug (saph)

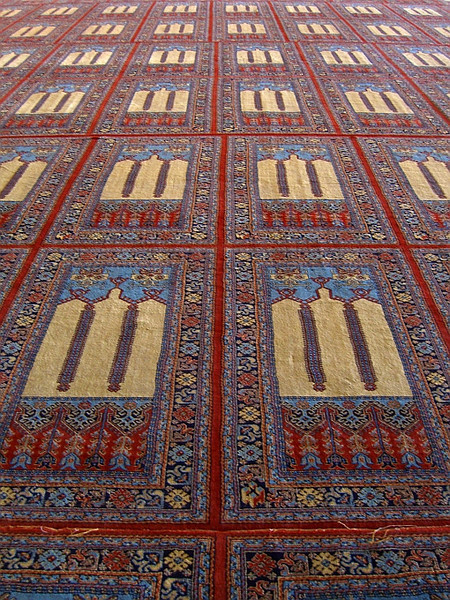
The Sultan Ahmed Mosque multiple-niche prayer rug (saph).

== See also ==
- Carpet weaving in Isparta

=== Types ===
- Bergama carpet
- Hereke carpet
- Konya Carpets and Rugs
- Milas carpet
- Ushak carpet
- Yürük rug

=== Other related rugs and carpets ===
- Oriental carpet
- Armenian carpet
- Kurdish rugs
- Persian rug
- Turkmen rug
