= Carpet weaving in Isparta =

Carpet weaving in Isparta developed towards the end of the 19th century. Isparta (Sparta) in Pisidia was one of the late regions to develop a carpet-weaving tradition. The Greek Orthodox population played a vital role in this development. As they were keen merchants, they linked their carpet production to the activity of the Oriental Carpet Manufacturers, a major company for carpets' production and export from the Ottoman Empire to the European countries and the United States. Pioneers in this process were the Isparta-born and of Greek Orthodox stock carpet-makers such as Prodromos Gregoriades, Iordanis and Damianos Styloglou, Philippos Kahramanoglou, Socrates and Damian Kahramanoglou, Minas Kehagioglou, Theodoris and Ioannis Papazoglou, Athanasios Pesmazoglou, Nikolaos Soutsoglou etc. Carpet weaving in Asia Minor belongs to a long tradition of carpet weaving, intrinsically related to the nomadic life of the turkic tribes which settled this region gradually from the 11th century onwards. As the nomads became sedentary, local styles in flat and pile rugs appeared; therefore we now discern styles according to place-names where these styles were more popular, such as Ushak carpet, Bergama Carpets, Konya carpets etc.

== Origins and history ==
Carpet weaving in Pisidian Isparta occurred at the end of the 19th century and was related mainly to the commercial and entrepreneurial skills of the Greek Orthodox population, of which some had the chance to study in Smyrna (modern İzmir) and in other major centres of the Ottoman Empire and Europe. They thus had the chance to learn more about technological innovation and trade precepts of the time. According to the Greek Orthodox tradition, the first carpet in Isparta was woven at the end of the 1880s by Katina Styloglou, on a pattern designed by her brother, Iordanis Styloglou. Katina was taught how to weave carpets by a lady called Polytimi Kiourtsoglou. Katina Styloglou was married to the doctor Prodromos Gregoriades, originating from Kayseri, a region famous for its carpet-weaving tradition. Gregoriades got personally involved and very active in the process of organizing carpet production in his wife's hometown; in partnership with her brothers Iordanis and Damian, they developed innovative methods in weaving, they organized production on a cartel-based model and they established a wide and effective network for selling their carpets. Thus, Isparta carpets reached Europe, where, due to their low prices, they became quickly very popular among the emerging middle classes. However, another tradition mentions as instigator of this whole process an Ottoman official originating from Isparta. It is possible that both traditions are true and complement each other. In any case, they attest to a general tendency towards the end of the 19th century to organize production according to western standards and to implement cooperation between the Muslim and Christian population.

== Production mode ==
The organization of production in Isparta attests to the first attempts at industrialization in Asia Minor. Several Isparta-born carpet manufacturers attempted at first to circumvent the major Smyrna-based trade houses; pretty soon, however, they realized that this was not possible. Thus, they finally signed business agreements with Oriental Carpet Manufacturers, one of the largest companies active in this field, which bought the carpets on a monopoly-based system, whereas it also provided the weavers with primary material, such as dyed yarns, and with technical assistance, namely specialized personnel who could improve the processes and final products. Carpet weaving was mostly a home-based production and the weavers were mainly women or girls over 8 years old, as was customary in those days in all carpet-weaving areas. In the Ottoman Empire, after all, child work was acceptable and widespread, whereas the age limit for adulthood was lower than today. The price paid was estimated on the basis of "knots" delivered, in contrast to the central manufactures of Oriental Carpets, where workers were paid on an eight-hours' shift basis.. Isparta weavers were paid much less (probably about half) than those in other traditional carpet-weaving centres, such as Uşak. This information is attested by the archives of the Oriental Carpets Manufacturers company. The reason is probably that the carpet manufacturers in Isparta wanted to compete successfully against their major rivals and to create a new carpet-weaving centre, having in mind to gradually increase the prices of their carpets and the wages of the workers accordingly. The number of looms that existed in Isparta is not certain. Some sources relate 600 looms and others up to 4,000. The latter figure is probably exaggerated. In any case, carpet weaving in Isparta developed rapidly, given the fact that it started at the end of the 1880s and lasted up to the expulsion of the Greek Orthodox population in 1922 (at least in the aforementioned form).

== Isparta carpets' features ==
Isparta carpets came in a standard quality, which enhanced their commercial value and demand. Their main feature was the cotton weft and the use of asymmetric knots Many of them belonged to the prayer-rug type, with triangular patterns which remind of a mihrab. The Isparta type rug, considered by Kahramanos, a standardized product of the 19th century, is woven with double-stranded yarns and in a smaller number of knots; their initial patterns were imitating popular Asia Minor styles, particularly those of Uşak, with a central medallion, decorated corners and lively colours. Soon, they turned to imitating Persian style, which proved much more popular in the western markets, particularly that of the United States. Later, n the 1920s and 1930s they followed Sarouk patterns. Initially yarns were dyed with natural, plant-based dyes, but soon, as elsewhere, they changed to chemically dyed yarns. The original wool on wool fabric was replaced to a combination of lamb's wool for the weft and cotton or linen for the warp.

== Technology and innovation ==
Carpet production in Isparta followed the technologically innovative solutions of that time such as the aforementioned replacement of natural dyes by chemical ones, which were cheaper. The anilins used at first were proved to be inconsistent, but soon chemistry provided new synthetic dyes with steady and standardized colours; this made the reproduction of the same pattern over and over again possible. The use of millimetric paper for designing the patterns, a technique developed and taught in Isparta by Iordanis Styloglou, allowed workers to reproduce patterns exactly in all their details. This technique also allowed for the import and reproduction of new, original patterns and colours which were popular in the export destination countries. According to Sherif Mardin, the paradigm set by the Greek Orthodox population was so successful, that the Ottoman authorities decided to found a school for carpet weaving in Isparta in 1891.

== Trade network ==
Isparta carpet weavers attempted to circumvent the Smyrna tradesmen who acted as middlemen and to collaborate directly with the United Kingdom through the Ottoman consular authorities; however this effort ended up badly and they finally had to accept collaboration with trade houses in Smyrna, run by families of Levantines who had access to the European markets. From 1908 onwards, when the trade house of Smyrna constituted the “Oriental Carpet Manufacturers”, and up to the beginning of World War I in 1914, carpet weaving in Isparta reached its peak. However, the War caused a severe blow to the trade network and the Oriental Carpets Manufacturers started vacillating. In that very year Ispara suffered damage by a destructive earthquake, which affected its production. At the end of the war, however, the Ispartan carpet makers founded their own trade houses in İzmir and went so well that they soon competed against their former "boss", namely the Oriental Carpets Manufacturers. However, the Greek occupation of İzmir in 1919 worsened the situation, as the land operations inland organized by the Greek army led to upheaval and hostilities. The final blow was struck by the forced deportation dislocation of the male adult population of Isparta in 1921 Kemal Atatürk's army and the departure of the rest of the Greek orthodox population of Isparta, in the fall of 1922.

== Carpet weaving after the expulsion of the Greek Orthodox population ==
The Greek Orthodox population had started being persecuted from 1915 onwards, when large part of the male population was driven to the "amele taburu", namely work battalions, as was also the case with most Greek communities in Asia Minor in which hundreds of thousands died. In 1922 the rest of the population, namely women and children, were also forced to leave. Through the port of Antalya they crossed the Aegean and landed in Volos and from there they were dispersed in various locations in Greece. The main bulk of Ispartans and Pisidians in general settled at Podarades and formed the nucleus of the present-day Athenian suburb of Nea Ionia. The choice of this region was deliberate, as there was abundant water from the torrent of Podoniftis, which enabled processing of yarns and thus textile and carpet weaving activities. Indeed, the first settlers borrowed funds from the National Bank or other sources and set up looms in small, artisanal units. The Refugees' Rehabilitation Committee worked vehemently to create the infrastructure for industrial activity, by buying large land plots which were almost given away gratis to entrepreneurs under the condition that the latter had to start producing within a three years' time frame. Some of the carpet manufacturers who developed industrial plants the Styloglou family, the Dourmousoglou family, the Bostantzoglou brothers et al. Carpet weaving activity soon flourished and was industrialized. Roughly 1,200 female carpet weavers worked within the industrial plants, whereas others continued to work at home. Several of these carpet weavers included also textile manufacturing in their activities, initially of woolen fabrics, then with cotton or even silk fabrics. This side activity allowed them to stand on their feet after 1929, when the American recession caused the demand for carpets to sink, given the fact that almost 90% of the production headed towards the United States and Western European countries. At the same time, many manufacturers originating from Asia Minor started forming trusts in order to have funds to continue their activity. The small manufactures developed into larger industrial units. This was the case with the "Sterlina" manufactures of the Styloglou brothers, who entered into a trust together with the Efraimoglou and Athanasoglou families, thus founding the wool-weaving company "Tria Alfa", extant to this day; similar was the path followed by the textile makers "Moutalaski", which was founded by the Tsalikoglou family and developed into a larger trust together with the Siniosoglou family. In 1924 was founded the first carpet weaving cooperative, called "Carpet-weaving copperative of Isparta, Pisidia". Its aim was to promote carpet weaving and achieve better funding through the Refugees' Rehabilitation Committee. Two more carpet companies, namely the Hellenic Carpet Company and the Oriental Carpet Company were founded just at the outskirts of the industrial zone of Eleftheroupoli (Nea Ionia-Perissos). In the same period the Hellenic Wool Manufacture, which had been founded in 1918, got on the fast track of development. On the other side of the Aegean Sea, in Pisidia, carpet weaving activity was continued by the Turkish population which remained there and is in fact thriving to this day. Isparta developed, side by side with İzmir and Istanbul, into one of the major carpet washing centres. Washing of carpets is a major step towards their finishing. This was at least attested by a World Trade report in the mid-20th century.
