= Cecil Edwards =

Cecil Edwards may refer to:

- Jack Karlson (1942–2024), born Cecil George Edwards, subject of the Australian viral video Democracy Manifest
- A. Cecil Edwards (1881 – 1953 or 1957), dealer in and authority on Persian carpets
- Cecil L. Edwards (1906–1995), chief clerk of the House and state legislative historian, see Oregon State Archives

== See also ==
- Cecile Hoover Edwards (1926–2005), American nutritional researcher
