= Karasi Bey =

Bey of Karasi from early 14th century until before 1328

Bey of Karasi
- Reign: c. 14th century – c. 1328
- Predecessor: Kalam
- Successor: Demir Khan; Yakhshi Khan
- Died: c. 1328
- Issue: Demir Khan; Yakhshi Khan
- Father: Kalam
- Religion: Islam

Karasi Bey (Turkish: Karesi Bey; died c. 1328), also known as Karasi Khan or Carases, was the eponymous Bey of the Karasids in northwestern Anatolia from the early 14th century to his death. Karasi and his father Kalam presumably seized the frontier of the Byzantine Empire near the ancient Mysia, excluding coastal regions, at an uncertain date. Karasi is absent from the chronicles of contemporary authors other than Gregoras. Later Ottoman sources described him as a nöker (vassal) of the Sultanate of Rum, during the first reign of Mesud II (r. 1284–97, 1303–8). Karasi likely died before 1328, when his son Demir Khan signed an agreement with the Byzantine Empire. (Note: Although contradicted by primary and secondary sources, some modern historians placed his death date in 1334–36 based on later Ottoman sources.)

== Background ==
Former Byzantine domains in Anatolia had come under the rule of the Seljuk Sultanate of Rum and other Islamic states sometime after the Battle of Manzikert in 1071. The Sultan of Rum, Kaykhusraw II (r. 1237–46) suffered a major defeat by the Mongol Empire at the Battle of Köse Dağ in 1243. The invading Mongol army further pushed Turkoman tribes to the peripheries of the peninsula, including the Byzantine frontier. The Karasids rose as one of the Turkish elements infiltrating the western Anatolian frontier from the east.

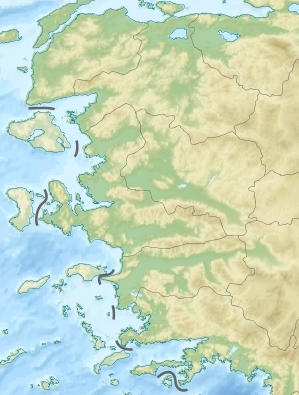
The locations associated with Karasi Bey in Anatolia.

The father of Karasi (or Carases as attested by Nicephorus Gregoras) was Kalam (identified as Calames by Gregoras). The epitaphs of members of a Karasi family in Tokat in central Anatolia (modern-day Turkey) dated 1415, Kutlu Melek and his son Mustafa Chelebi, trace their ancestry to the Danishmendids, a dynasty that ruled northeastern Anatolia during the 11–12th centuries. Some historians such as İsmail Hakkı Uzunçarşılı note the connection between the Danishmendids and the Karasids in their works. In contrast, orientalist and historian Claude Cahen argues that the homonymy between the central Anatolian family and the Karasid dynasty in northwestern Anatolia may not be sufficient evidence for a connection. Historian Clifford Edmund Bosworth describes the theory connecting the dynasty to the Danishmendids as "almost certainly legendary". While historian Elizabeth Zachariadou agrees that "Malik Danishmend", the first Danishmendid ruler, is a remote ancestor of the Karasids, she highlights that other names mentioned in the epitaphs are echoed in earlier medieval sources. Based on the epitaphs, "Baghdi Bey" or "Yaghdi Bey" was the father of Kalam, who was the father of Karasi Khan. Zachariadou favors the reading of "Baghdi" as it aligns with Pagdinis, a ruler mentioned by the Byzantine writer George Pachymeres.

The names of Karasi and Kalam might have been connected to two towns near Germa, Akarasos and Kalamos. Zachariadou observes that Karasi is not a Turkish name and may have been taken from the name of the town he controlled, as was the case with other Turkish emirs, such as "Izmir oghlu". Karasi was connected to the name "Kara Isa" (lit. 'Isa the Black') by some authors, though this interpretation was rejected by Uzunçarşılı. The name Kalam might have been Turkish as it is attested in Byzantine sources as the name of a tatas (godfather), who was a Christianized Turk.

== Reign ==
Later Ottoman sources referred to Karasi as a nöker (vassal) during the first reign of Mesud II (r. 1284–97, 1303–8), Sultan of Rum. Karasi Bey, along with his father Kalam, presumably took over the region around Balıkesir during Mesud's reign and claimed independence at an unknown date. Fifteenth century Byzantine Greek historian Doukas wrote that they appeared in the region during the rule of the Byzantine Emperor Andronikos II (r. 1282–1328). It corresponded to the ancient region of Mysia, excluding the towns of Artaki, Pegae, Adramytion, Pergamon, and Dardanellia. However, Cahen proposes that the state appeared much later as medieval writers Ramon Muntaner and George Pachymeres do not mention the Karasids. Historian Mordtmann identified a certain Calames (Karasi's father Kalam) attested to by Nicephorus Gregoras as the Lamisai mentioned by Pachymeres, which was disputed by Cahen.

Karasi expanded into Lesser Mysia and reached south bordering the Sarukhanids, following the futile western Anatolian campaigns in 1302–8 headed by the Byzantines and their allied mercenaries, the Catalan Company and the Alans. In 1311, Karasi supported the Sari Saltuk tribe led by Ece Halil who clashed with the Byzantine Empire in Thrace. Karasi Bey allowed troops who survived the struggle to take refuge in his realm. Pachymeres reported that the Catalan mercenaries defeated the "Turks" in Germe, east of Pergamos, which Zachariadou suggests were the Karasids. Karasi died sometime before 1328, when his son and successor Demir Khan made an agreement with the Byzantines. Cahen identified Ajlan, a Karasid ruler mentioned by later Ottoman sources, as Karasi's nickname. Based on Ajlan's death detailed by those sources, some researchers placed Karasi's death year as 1334 or 1336. However, primary sources referred to Ajlan as the "son of Karasi". Historian Zerrin Günal instead identified Ajlan as Karasi's son Yakhshi.

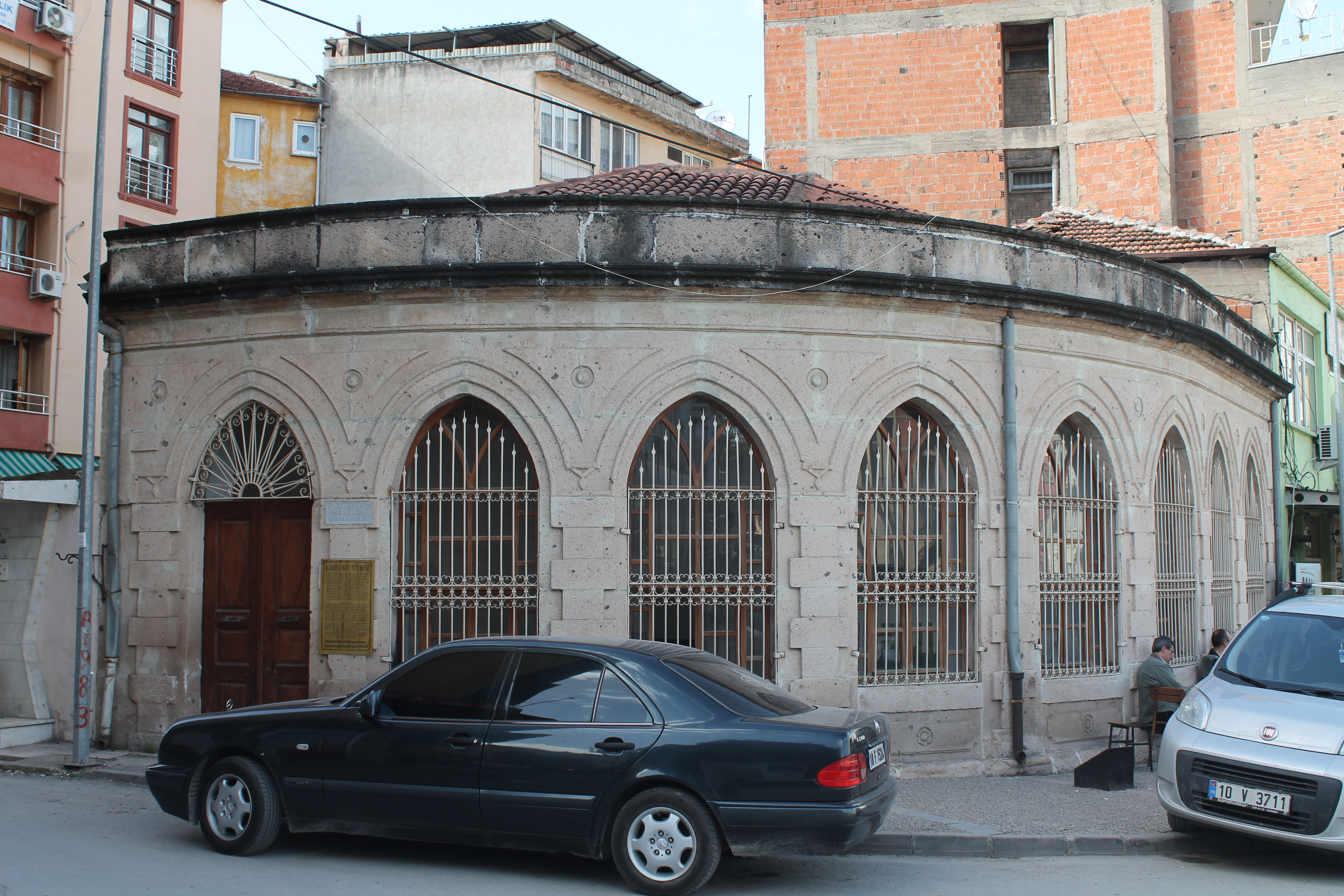
Tomb of Karasi in Balıkesir, photographed in 2013.

There is a türbe (tomb) dedicated to Karasi in the Mustafa Fakih neighborhood of the town of Balıkesir, close to the Pasha Mosque. The tomb houses five additional graves, besides Karasi, reputed to be those of his sons. Karasi's sarcophagus is ornamented with inscriptions in Kufic script.

== Bibliography ==
- Bosworth, Clifford Edmund (1996). New Islamic Dynasties: A Chronological and Genealogical Manual. Edinburgh University Press. ISBN 9780231107143. OCLC 35029627.
- Cahen, Claude & de Planhol, Xavier (1978). "Ḳarasi̊". In van Donzel, E.; Lewis, B.; Pellat, Ch. & Bosworth, C. E. (eds.). The Encyclopaedia of Islam, Second Edition. Volume IV: Iran–Kha. Leiden: E. J. Brill. ISBN 978-90-04-05745-6. OCLC 758278456.
- Günal, Zerrin (2001). "Karesi Bey". TDV Encyclopedia of Islam, Vol. 24 (Kāânî-i Şîrâzî – Kastamonu) (in Turkish). Istanbul: Presidency of Religious Affairs, Centre for Islamic Studies. pp. 487–488. ISBN 978-975-389-451-7.
- Peacock, Andrew Christian Spencer (2000). "Saljuqs iii. Saljuqs of Rum". In Yarshater, Ehsan (ed.). Encyclopædia Iranica (Online ed.). Encyclopædia Iranica Foundation.
- Uzunçarşılı, İsmail Hakkı (1969). Anadolu Beylikleri Ve Akkoyunlu, Karakoyunlu Devletleri [Anatolian Beyliks and Aq Qoyunlu, Qara Qoyunlu States] (in Turkish). Ankara: Turkish Historical Society Press. ISBN 9751624576. OCLC 563553149.
- Zachariadou, Elizabeth (11–13 January 1991). "The Emirate of Karasi and That of the Ottomans: Two Rival States". The Ottoman Emirate (1300–1389). Halcyon Days in Crete I. Rethymnon: Foundation for Research & Technology – Hellas, Institute for Mediterranean Studies. pp. 226–236. ISBN 9789607309587.
