= Demir Khan =

Bey of Karasi from c. 1328 to 1332

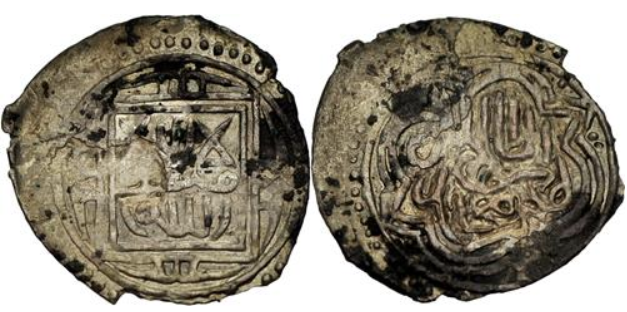
- Undated coin minted by Demir Khan.

Bey of Karasi
- Reign: c. 1328 – 1332
- Predecessor: Karasi Bey
- Successor: Yakhshi Khan
- Died: c. 1347
- Issue: Jüje Khan
- Father: Karasi Bey
- Religion: Islam

Demir Khan, aka Demirhan, was Bey of Karasi from c. 1328 to 1332.

According to modern historian Elizabeth Zachariadou, Demir Khan inherited the throne from his father Karasi Bey. Demir Khan was the ruler of Balıkesir, while his brother Yakhshi Khan controlled the area around Pergamos, though Zachariadou pointed out Demir Khan was likely the senior emir. Demir Khan was also identified as Yakhshi Khan's son, specifically by the Byzantine historian and Emperor John VI Kantakouzenos (r. 1347–54), which is claimed to be false by several historians.

Demir Khan harassed the towns near Cyzicus and raided coastal parts of southern Balkans through his naval forces based in the Sea of Marmara. For this matter, Byzantine Emperor Andronikos III (r. 1328–41) met with Demir Khan in Pegai in 1328, when they signed a treaty. In 1333, Demir Khan met with the Maghrebi traveller Ibn Battuta. Ibn Battuta deemed Demir Khan a "worthless" person like the population of Balıkesir, and mentioned that the former was disliked by his own people. According to historian al-Uryan, the ruler of Pergamos was "Senbogha", who was subordinate to Demir Khan. Some modern historians maintain that Demir Khan had a short reign.

Demir Khan is alternatively identified as Karasi's later ruler (Yakhshi's son). Claude Cahen proposes that Ajlan, the Karasid prince mentioned by Ottoman sources (died c. 1335) may have been Karasi Bey's nickname, and so his sons who were involved in a dynastic conflict may be Demir Khan and Yakhshi Khan (named Dursun). Dursun was subsequently killed, and the Ottomans thus annexed the territory.

== Bibliography ==
- Bosworth, Clifford Edmund (1996). New Islamic Dynasties: A Chronological and Genealogical Manual. Edinburgh University Press. ISBN 9780231107143. OCLC 35029627.
- Cahen, Claude & de Planhol, Xavier (1978). "Ḳarasi̊". In van Donzel, E.; Lewis, B.; Pellat, Ch. & Bosworth, C. E. (eds.). The Encyclopaedia of Islam, Second Edition. Volume IV: Iran–Kha. Leiden: E. J. Brill. ISBN 978-90-04-05745-6. OCLC 758278456.
- Foss, Clive (2022). The Beginnings of the Ottoman Empire. Oxford Studies in Byzantium. Oxford University Press. ISBN 9780198865438.
- Günal, Zerrin (2001). "Karesioğulları". TDV Encyclopedia of Islam, Vol. 24 (Kāânî-i Şîrâzî – Kastamonu) (in Turkish). Istanbul: Presidency of Religious Affairs, Centre for Islamic Studies. pp. 488–489. ISBN 978-975-389-451-7.
- Uzunçarşılı, İsmail Hakkı (1969). Anadolu Beylikleri Ve Akkoyunlu, Karakoyunlu Devletleri [Anatolian Beyliks and Aq Qoyunlu, Qara Qoyunlu States] (in Turkish). Turkish Historical Society Press. ISBN 9751624576. OCLC 563553149.
- Zachariadou, Elizabeth (11–13 January 1991). "The Emirate of Karasi and That of the Ottomans: Two Rival States". The Ottoman Emirate (1300–1389). Halcyon Days in Crete I. Rethymnon: Foundation for Research & Technology – Hellas, Institute for Mediterranean Studies. pp. 226–236.
