= Karasids =

Dynasty in northwestern Anatolia from c. 1300 to 1345

Karisid Beylik Ottoman Turkish: قرا صـی Turkish: Karesioğulları Beyliği
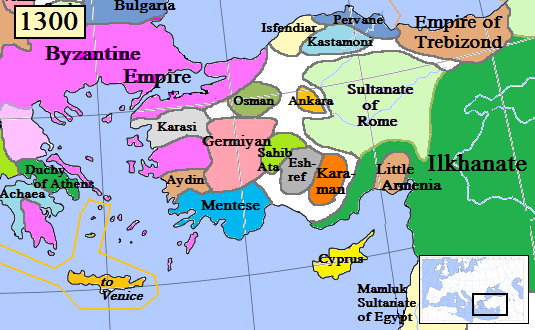
- Karasid dynasty (light gray) in 1300.
- Capital: Balıkesir; Bergama
- Religion: Islam
Preceded by	Succeeded by
Seljuk Sultanate of Rum; Byzantine Empire	Ottoman Empire
- Today part of: Turkey; Balıkesir; Çanakkale

The Karasids (Ottoman Turkish: قرا صـی; Turkish: Karesioğulları) were a Turkoman dynasty that ruled the region of Mysia in northwestern Anatolia during the first half of the 14th century. While legendary lineages link the family to the Danishmendids, an 11–12th-century dynasty in central Anatolia, the earliest Karasid rulers the eponymous Karasi Bey and his father Kalam Shah are thought to have taken over the region around Balıkesir during the reign of Mesud II (r. 1284–97, 1303–8) of the Sultanate of Rum claiming independence. Following the death of Karasi Bey, the dynasty ended up ruling two separate emirates, headed by Demir Khan and Yakhshi Khan. Demir Khan is known to have harassed the town of Cyzicus and settlements in Thrace through his naval forces and thus signed a truce with the Byzantine Emperor Andronikos III (r. 1328–41) in 1328. In 1333, he met with Ibn Battuta, who wrote unfavorably about him. Suleiman Bey, the latest Karasid ruler attested to by Byzantine sources, was married to the daughter of John Vatatzes and meddled with the internal strife within the Byzantine domains. Byzantine sources ceased mentioning the Karasids after that point.

The Ottoman acquisition of the Karasid domains is wrapped in obscurity and was described by sources from the 15th century with incongruent details. Ajlan Bey, "son of Karasi", had two sons, one of whom was named Dursun. Following the death of Ajlan, Dursun fled to the Ottoman domains, while his brother stayed behind with their father, but was unpopular among his subjects. Dursun offered the Ottoman Sultan Orhan (r. 1323–62) control of the Karasid domains, which led to the capture of those lands and the surrender of his other brother. Modern historians vary widely in their efforts to construct the Karasid genealogy merging the details provided by the Byzantine and Ottoman sources.

== History ==
=== Origins ===
The epitaphs of members of a certain Karasi family in Tokat dated 1415, Kutlu Melek and his son Mustafa Chelebi, tie their ancestry to the Danishmendids, a dynasty that ruled over northeastern Anatolia during the 11–12th centuries. Modern historians such as İsmail Hakkı Uzunçarşılı relayed the connection between the Danishmendids and the Karasids in their works. Claude Cahen held that the homonymy between the central Anatolian family and the dynasty in northwestern Anatolia may not be sufficient evidence for a connection. Clifford Edmund Bosworth described the theory connecting the dynasty to the Danishmendids as "almost certainly legendary". Elizabeth Zachariadou explained that while "Malik Danishmend" is a mythical remote ancestor, the rest of the names mentioned in the epitaphs are echoed in contemporary sources, with Baghdi Bey or Yaghdi Bey being the father of Kalam Shah. Based on a mention of Pagdinis by medieval writer George Pachymeres, Zachariadou stated the reading of "Yaghdi" should be ignored in favor of "Baghdi". The eponymous founding ruler of the dynasty, Karasi Bey (r. early 14th century – 1328) was the son of Kalam Shah.

The names of Karasi and Kalam might have been connected to two towns near Germa, Kalamos and Akarasos. Zachariadou highlighted Karasi is not a Turkish name and may have been taken from the name of the town he controlled, which was precedented in other Turkish emirates. Karasi was connected to the name "Kara Isa" (lit. 'Isa the black') by some authors, though it was rejected by Uzunçarşılı. The name Kalam might have been Turkish as it was precedented in Byzantine sources as the name of a tatas (godfather), who was a Christianized Turk.

=== Rise ===
Later Ottoman sources referred to Karasi as a nöker (vassal) during the first reign of Mesud II (r. 1284–97, 1303–8), the Sultan of Rum. Kalam and Karasi Bey are thought to have taken over the region around Balıkesir during Mesud's reign and claimed independence at an unknown date. Fifteenth century Byzantine Greek historian Doukas wrote that they appeared in the region during the rule of the Byzantine Emperor Andronikos II (r. 1282–1328). It corresponded to the ancient region of Mysia, excluding the towns of Artaki, Pegae, Adramytion, Pergamon, and Dardanellia. However, Cahen proposes that the state appeared much later as medieval writers Ramon Muntaner and George Pachymeres do not mention the Karasids. Cahen disputes historian Mordtmann's connection of the Lamisai mentioned by Pachymeres and the Calames (Karasi's father Kalam) of Nicephorus Gregoras.

Following the Byzantine campaign in western Anatolia allied with Catalan Company and Alans between 1302 and 1308, Karasi expanded into Lesser Mysia and reached south bordering the Sarukhanids. In 1311, Karasi is also known to have provided support to the Sari Saltuk tribe led by Ece Halil who clashed with the Byzantine Empire in Thrace. Karasi Bey accepted troops who survived the struggle to take refuge in his realm. Pachymeres reported that the Catalan mercenaries defeated the "Turks" in Germe, east of Pergamos, which Zachariadou suggests were the Karasids.

=== Division ===
Karasi is thought to have died before 1328, when his successor Demir Khan reached an agreement with the Byzantines. After Karasi, Demir Khan and Yakhshi Khan ruled over two separate emirates. The former was the ruler of Balıkesir, while the latter controlled the area around Pergamos. Demir Khan was likely the senior emir as he had the authority to sign a truce with the Byzantines. Demir Khan and Yakhshi Khan are generally accepted to have been brothers. The Byzantine historian and Emperor John VI Kantakouzenos (r. 1347–54) described Demir Khan as the son of Yakhshi Khan, which several modern historians align with.

Demir Khan harassed the towns near Cyzicus and raided coastal parts of southern Balkans through his naval forces based in the Sea of Marmara. For this matter, Byzantine Emperor Andronikos III (r. 1328–41) met with Demir Khan in Pegai in 1328, when they signed a treaty. In 1333, Demir Khan met with the Maghrebi traveller Ibn Battuta. Ibn Battuta deemed Demir Khan a "worthless" person like the population of Balıkesir, and mentioned that the former was disliked by his own people. According to historian al-Uryan, the ruler of Pergamos was "Senbogha", who was subordinate to Demir Khan. Some modern historians maintain that Demir Khan had a short reign.

Suleiman Bey was married to the daughter of John Vatatzes. Allied with Suleiman, Vatatzes attacked Thrace in support of the dowager empress Anna of Savoy amidst a civil war against John VI Kantakouzenos. Despite earlier alliance, the Karasid forces later switched sides and killed John Vatatzes, owing to their cordial relations with Kantakouzenos. Suleiman further refused a major bribe offered by Isaac Asan, a panhypersebastos allied with the empress, to incite a Karasid offensive on Kantakouzenos. The Karasids ceased to be mentioned by the Byzantine sources after this point.

=== Ottoman acquisition ===
Fifteenth-century Ottoman historian Aşıkpaşazade detailed the events leading to the Ottoman acquisition of the Karasid domains, providing a conflicting narrative. Ajlan Bey, "son of Karasi", had two sons, one of whom was named Dursun. Following the death of Ajlan, Dursun fled to the Ottoman domains, while his brother stayed behind with their father, but was unpopular among his subjects. Dursun offered the Ottoman Sultan Orhan (r. 1323–62) control of Balıkesir, Bergama, and Edremit with the exception of two minor coastal settlements to the west. Orhan thus set west, seizing towns controlled by Christian rulers on the way. The other son escaped Balıkesir, when it fell to the Ottomans, and took refuge in Pergamos. The locals submitted to the Ottoman rule. Aşıkpaşazade dated this event to 1335. Orhan declared his sovereignty over the land by being named in khutba wa sikka (sermon and coins). The other son surrendered Pergamos and was transported to Bursa, where he would die two years later. The Karasid domains were given to Orhan's son Suleiman as timar. The Chronological List of 1421 dated the Ottoman acquisition to 1348/9. The connection between the Ottoman narrative with the details known from prior sources remains obscure.

Modern historians vary in their attempts to reconcile incongruent accounts of Byzantine and Ottoman sources. According to Elizabeth Zachariadou, Ajlan was the son of Yakhshi Khan, and Ajlan's other son was Suleiman. Konstantin Zhukov aligned with Zachariadou but further suggested either Ajlan or Suleiman could have been the same person as Beylerbey Chelebi, who is attested to on Karasid coins. Historian Zerrin Günal instead identified Yakhshi Khan as Ajlan and his other son as Demir Khan. Claude Cahen mentioned Ajlan was Karasi Bey's nickname, although Aşıkpaşazade specified Ajlan as the "son of Karasi". Uzunçarşılı claimed Demir Khan was attested to as Ajlan due to a typographical error. He additionally identified Dursun as the other brother of Demir Khan (Ajlan). Clive Foss identified Ajlan's other son as Hajji Ilbey, who he suggested is the Beylerbey Chelebi, who is honored on Karasid coins and was the successor of Yakhshi.

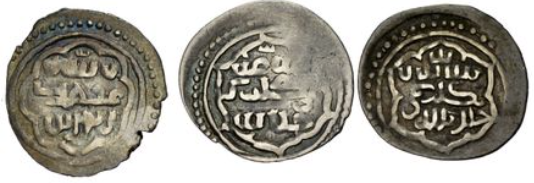
Undated Karasid coins mentioning Beylerbey Chelebi.

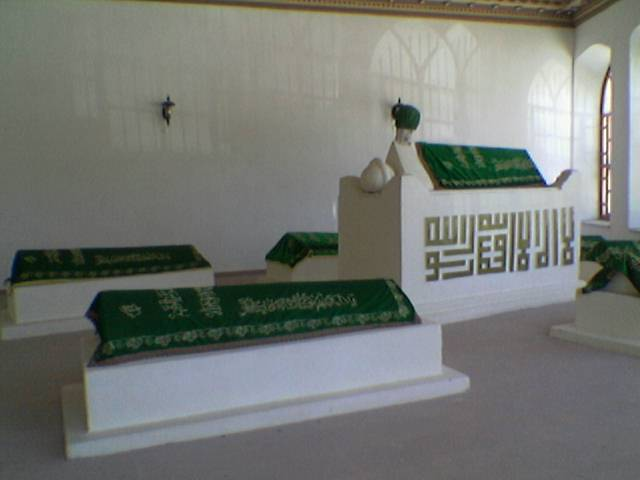
Karasi Principality tomb in Balıkesir

The Byzantines tried to incite beyliks like Karasids against the Ottomans. However, routes of conquest and other objectives of beyliks such as Karasids did not initially conflict with the Ottomans. The political situation clearly favored the Ottomans.

== See also ==
- List of Sunni Muslim dynasties

== Bibliography ==
- Bosworth, Clifford Edmund (1996). New Islamic Dynasties: A Chronological and Genealogical Manual. Edinburgh University Press. ISBN 9780231107143. OCLC 35029627.
- Cahen, Claude & de Planhol, Xavier (1978). "Ḳarasi̊". In van Donzel, E.; Lewis, B.; Pellat, Ch. & Bosworth, C. E. (eds.). The Encyclopaedia of Islam, Second Edition. Volume IV: Iran–Kha. Leiden: E. J. Brill. OCLC 758278456.
- Foss, Clive (2022). The Beginnings of the Ottoman Empire. Oxford Studies in Byzantium. Oxford University Press. ISBN 9780198865438.
- Günal, Zerrin (2001). "Karesi Bey". TDV Encyclopedia of Islam, Vol. 24 (Kāânî-i Şîrâzî – Kastamonu) (in Turkish). Istanbul: Presidency of Religious Affairs, Centre for Islamic Studies. pp. 487–488. ISBN 978-975-389-451-7.
- Halil Inalcik, The Ottoman Empire - The Classical Age, 1300-1600
- Uzunçarşılı, İsmail Hakkı (1969). Anadolu Beylikleri Ve Akkoyunlu, Karakoyunlu Devletleri [Anatolian Beyliks and Aq Qoyunlu, Qara Qoyunlu States] (in Turkish). Turkish Historical Society Press. ISBN 9751624576. OCLC 563553149.
- Zachariadou, Elizabeth (11–13 January 1991). "The Emirate of Karasi and That of the Ottomans: Two Rival States". The Ottoman Emirate (1300–1389). Halcyon Days in Crete I. Rethymnon: Foundation for Research & Technology – Hellas, Institute for Mediterranean Studies. pp. 226–236.
- Zhukov, Konstantin (11–13 January 1991). "Ottoman, Karasid, and Sarukhanid Coinages and the Problem of Currency Community in Turkish Western Anatolia ('40s – '80s of the 14th Century)". The Ottoman Emirate (1300–1389). Halcyon Days in Crete I. Rethymnon: Foundation for Research & Technology – Hellas, Institute for Mediterranean Studies. pp. 237–243.
