= DOBAG Carpet Initiative =

Turkish carpet weaving project

DOBAG is the Turkish acronym for "Doğal Boya Araştırma ve Geliştirme Projesi" (the Natural Dye Research and Development Project). The project aims at reviving the traditional Turkish art and craft of carpet weaving. It provides inhabitants of a rural village in Anatolia – mostly female – with a regular source of income. The DOBAG initiative marks the return of the traditional rug production by using hand-spun wool dyed with natural colours, which was subsequently adopted in other rug-producing countries.

== Background and history ==
The DOBAG project started in 1981, led by Harald Boehmer, a German chemistry and biology teacher, in cooperation with the Marmara University in Istanbul. He focused on chemical analyses of the dyes of antique woven carpets, such as those on display in Istanbul museums.

=== Use of synthetic dyes in Oriental carpets ===
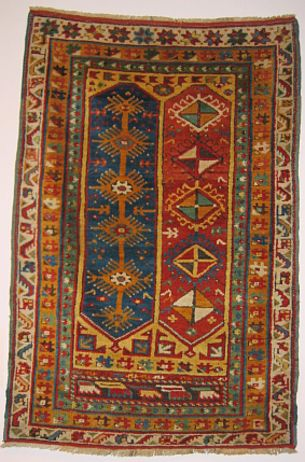
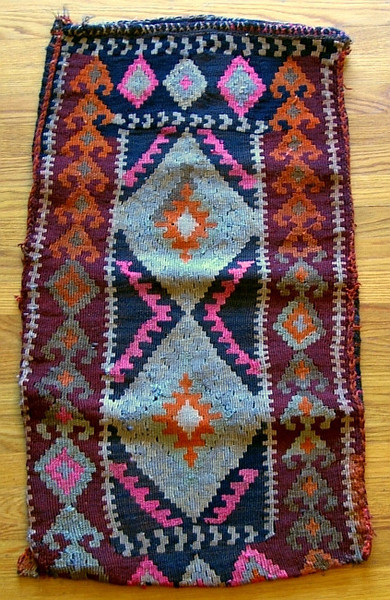
Left image: Pile rug, circa 1875; Southwestern Anatolia, with bright but harmonic natural dyes
Right image: Tribal Kurdish Cuval, ca. 1880 in traditional design, with harsh synthetic colours.

Synthetic dyes were discovered in the late 19th century. Until then, wool used for weaving carpets was dyed with traditional dyes made from plants, insects and minerals. Synthetic dyes were cheap and easy to use and thus replaced the traditional dyes soon after they were made widely available. Western art historians reported instability to light and moisture of carpets with synthetic dyes. The aesthetic effect in oriental carpets with synthetic colours was described by A. Cecil Edwards as "having a hard, metallic look" and being "dull and dead". To be commercially successful, synthetically dyed carpets have to be chemically treated before they go on sale.

=== Analysis of natural dyes, and recreation of traditional dyeing procedures ===
The analysis of carpet wool dyes was already suggested by Edwards in 1953 as a means of establishing the provenance of period carpets. In 1982, Boehmer published his work on antique carpet wool samples, using thin-layer chromatography. By comparing chromatograms of samples of both carpet wool and plants known to have been used for dyeing, the natural dye components were identified, and the dyeing procedures experimentally recreated subsequently.

The first demonstration of traditional dyeing techniques took place in some villages of the Ayvacik area in Çanakkale. The region was chosen because of its long, continuous carpet weaving tradition. Later, another branch of the project was initiated in the Yuntdağ region, south of Bergama. Here, the first women cooperative in Turkey was established within the DOBAG Project.

=== DOBAG's approach to carpet manufacturing ===
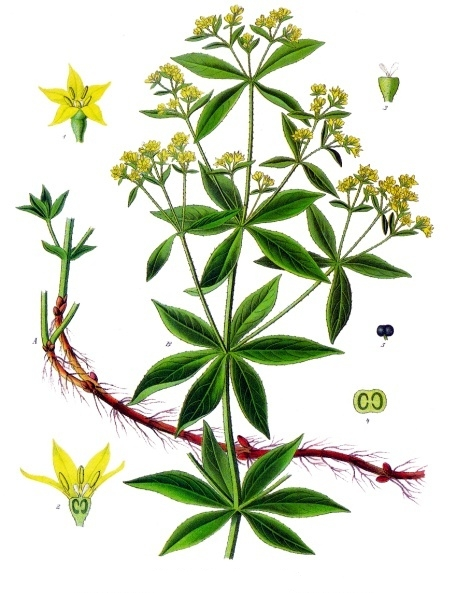
Madder (Rubia tinctorum) plant

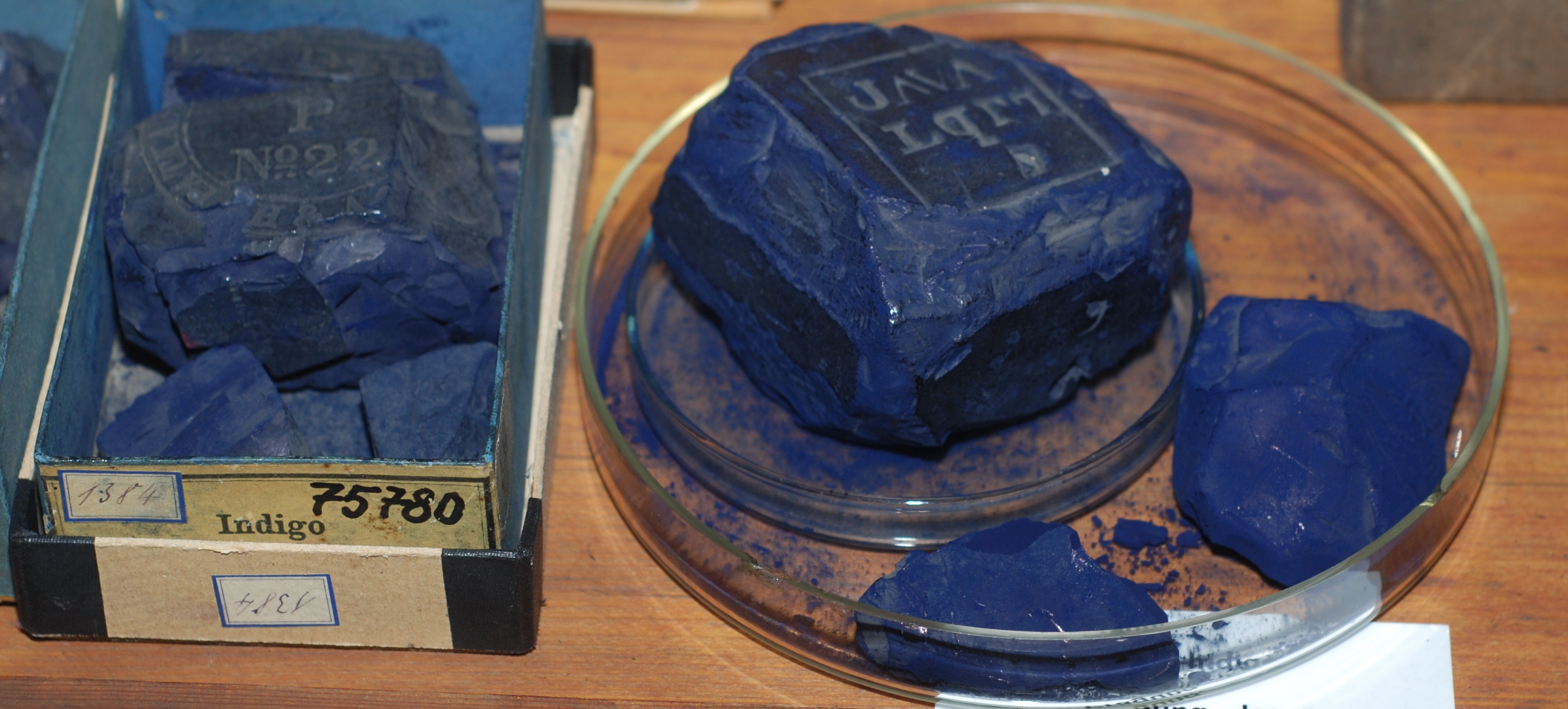
Indigo, historical dye collection of the Dresden University of Technology, Germany

DOBAG carpets are woven with Turkish knots. The carpets are made of hand spun sheep wool, dyed locally with natural dyes prepared according to the recipes as experimentally re-established. No chemical treatment is applied after the carpet has been finished.

Dyes used for DOBAG carpets are obtained from plants and include:

- Red from Madder (Rubia tinctorum) roots,
- Yellow from plants, including Onion (Allium cepa), specific chamomile species (Anthemis, Matricaria chamomilla), and Euphorbia,
- Black: Oak apples, Oak acorns, and Tanner's sumach,
- Green by double dyeing with Indigo and yellow dye.
- Orange by double dyeing with madder red and yellow dye.
- Blue: Synthetic Indigo is used because it is chemically identical to natural indigo gained from Indigofera tinctoria.

DOBAG carpets are delivered both with a leather tag and seal attached to the carpet for identification, as well as with a certificate stating the weaver's name, village, and region where the carpet was woven. DOBAG carpet weavers are paid per knot, thus ensuring a fair wage system. Once a carpet has been sold, the weaver is granted an additional bonus. The commercial branch of the initiative directly exports the carpets to authorized dealers only, thus avoiding intermediate trade.

Thus, technically, the DOBAG project seeks to revive the tradition of Turkish carpet weaving. On a social level, the project aims at halting the effects of urbanization by providing a continuous source of income to village women.

== Impact of the DOBAG Project ==
=== Initiation of the "Carpet Renaissance" ===
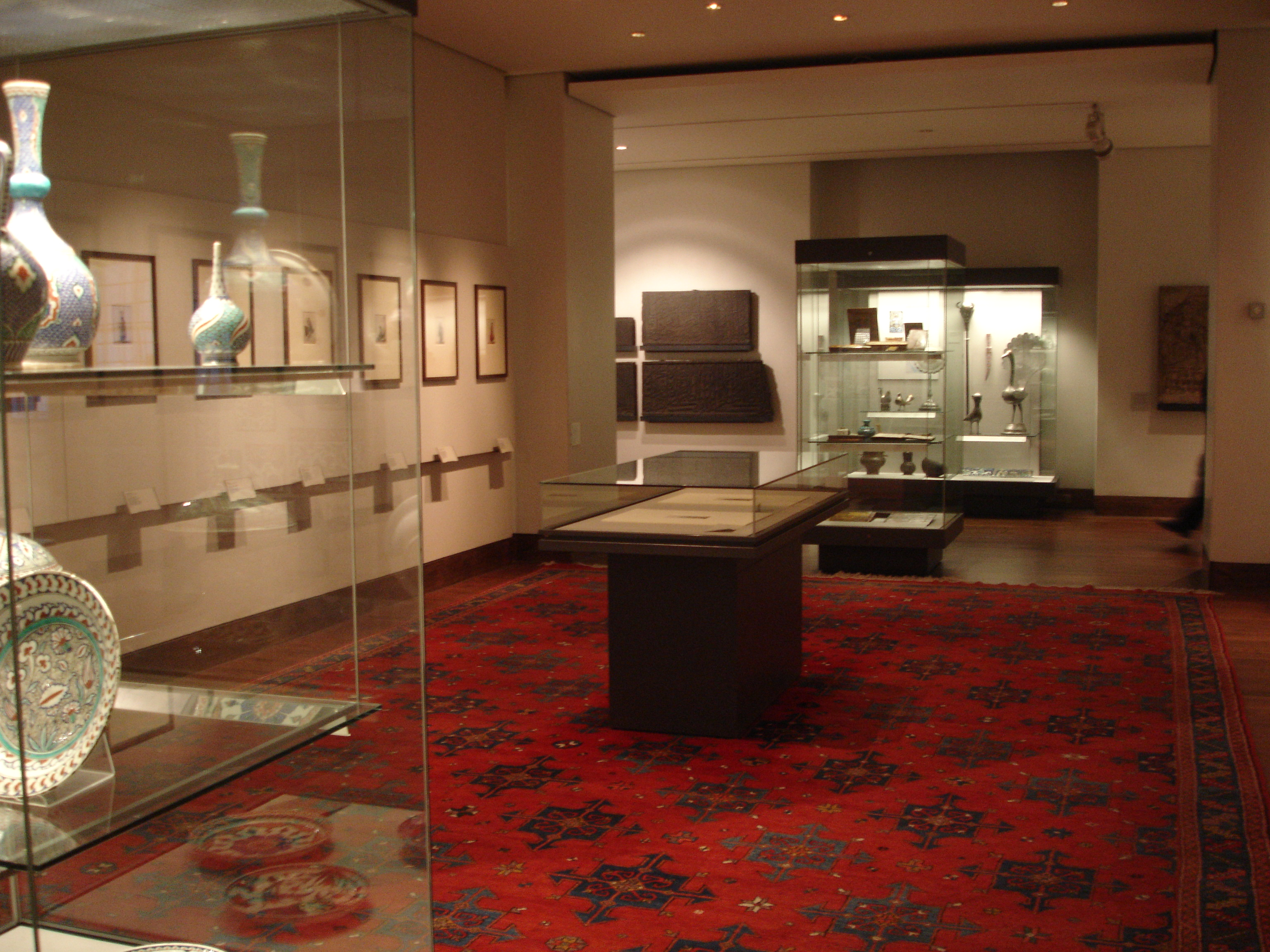
DOBAG carpet commissioned for the British Museum's Islamic Gallery

DOBAG carpets were first shown publicly for an exhibition at the Bausback Antique Carpet Gallery in Mannheim, Germany, from November 27 to December 24, 1982.

DOBAG carpets are on display in, or have been commissioned by, the British Museum, the Victoria and Albert Museum, All Souls College, Oxford, the Academy of Sciences and De Young Museum of Asian Art, San Francisco, the National Museum of Ethnology, Osaka, the Museum of Ethnology, Vienna, and the National Museum of Scotland.

Realizing the commercial potential of carpets woven from hand-spun, plant-dyed wool, other carpet manufacturers adopted DOBAG's manufacturing approach. This, and the commercial interest this created among customers, was termed by Emmett Eilland as the "Carpet Renaissance".

=== Social aspects ===
The DOBAG project's combination of commercial and social goals has inspired similar initiatives to use profits made from carpet weaving to improve the social and economic situation of the weavers, including the following:

- The Cultural Survival Ersari Turkmen Project supports Afghan refugees.
- Barakat, Inc., a non-profit organization providing basic education and medical care to Afghan refugees.
- The Survival Tibetan Project supports Tibetans.

=== Scientific aspects ===
Scientific interest in the history and ethnology of oriental carpet weaving arose in the late 19th century. Art historian Wilhelm von Bode stated in 1902 that the art and craft of carpet weaving was not fully accessible to scientific research. The introduction of synthetic dyes and commercially oriented designs was regarded as a corruption, atypical for a specific region, so that it was no longer possible to establish the provenience of oriental carpets, and analyse the evolution of regional designs and weaving techniques. By its cooperation with the Marmara University Department of Traditional Handicrafts and Design, the DOBAG project provides an opportunity for prospective research into the art historical and the socio-economic consequences of the re-introduction of traditional carpet weaving in rural areas of Anatolia.

In 2000, the Turkish Cultural Foundation set up the Cultural Heritage Preservation and Natural Dyes Laboratory. Their mission is "to promote the natural dye resources of Turkey (...) to revive the art of natural dyeing, and create employment opportunities in this area for rural people." Their recent publications and symposium activities broaden the knowledge of traditional carpet weaving in Turkey.
