= Alexander Savvas =

Greek physician and academic

Alexander Savvas (1907–1981) was a Greek professor of medicine at the Aristotle University of Thessaloniki, Faculty of Anatomy. He wrote a number of anatomy books and research protocols on human anatomy, histology, and embryology, and was influential among Greek physicians for his educational method and proficient use of the Greek language and medical terminology.

== Biography ==
He was born in Pergamon (modern-day Bergama) in the Ottoman Empire on 10 March 1907. The eldest of four children in the family of Panagiotis Savvas, a trader of oil and soap. His early school years were defined by events of the time, namely the destruction and expulsion of the Greek population in Asia Minor. His education began at the Municipal School of Pergamon, continued at the Elementary School of Mytilene and the Second Boys’ Primary School in Mytilene, in the historic Kydoniai Gymnasium (one of the greatest academic centers of Asia Minor), in the Semi-gymnasium of Pergamon and finally the six-grade High School in Athens. He was an outstanding student throughout the course of his schooling. He faced tragedy at the age of 15, when his whole family perished during the Asia Minor Catastrophe (1922). After pausing his studies for two years, he completed High School with honors in Athens (1927).

In 1927, he entered medical school and succeeded, especially in the course of Anatomy under Professor G. Sklavounos.

In 1929, he was appointed as an assistant in Anatomy "secretary second class" and an unpaid assistant in the Laboratory of Histology-Embryology, while working to maintain himself. In 1934 he received his degree with a grade of "Excellent".

In 1939, he submitted his doctoral thesis entitled "Contribution to the study of human renal artery (after own observations)", so was acclaimed Doctor of Medicine from the University of Athens, with "Excellent".

In 1940, with the start of the Greco-Italian War, he joined the Greek Army as a reservist army assistant surgeon, and served at the Military Hospital of Thessaloniki and in the Field Surgery of Korytsa (Korçë) as a surgeon.

In 1942, he submitted his candidacy for the position of Professor of Medicine University of Thessaloniki, but N. Michalakeas was elected to the seat. Savvas continued to prepare cadavers, teach, and create histological preparations of anatomy in Athens, as a member of the Medical Society of Athens, and teacher of Anatomy and Physiology to the students at the National College of Physical Education. In 1946 his position in Athens ended, but in the academic year 1948-1949 he was called back as honorary director.

In October 1949, Savvas published his dissertation on fellowship with the title "On the formation of the neural mesh of man" and went to Thessaloniki, where he took up a position as teacher in Anatomy.

In March 1950, he was elected Professor of Anatomy at the Medical School of the Aristotle University; the election was cancelled in May, and he was elected to the position of temporary Professor of Anatomy in May 1951.

During 1953, he worked in Stockholm, on a scholarship from the World Health Organization, on the microscopic anatomy of the central nervous system.

On 22 January 1954, he was elected full Professor of Descriptive Anatomy.

In the academic year 1963-1964, he was elected Dean of the Faculty of Medicine. He retired on 31 August 1968. He died at the age of 74, in 1981.

== Work ==
Savvas offered a premium educational project to prospective physicians on the Science of Anatomy, Histology and Embryology human both theoretical and laboratory level. He has published and research work. During the tenure of Professor Al. Savva occurred transportation Anatomy of the historic building of the road Katsimidou to the new buildings of the Medical School campus thus fulfilling the dream of Professor for a modern and well-equipped Anatomy.

== Personal life ==
Savvas married Zoe Alivizatou in 1951, with whom he had a son, Panagiotis, in 1952.

== Publications ==
• About the tendons records good abdominal muscles (after own observations) (May 1938).

• Case of right aortic arch, without dextrocardia, with rare right lung abnormality (1939).

• On a case of bilateral absence of muscle imiymenodous (May 1939).

• Contribution to the study of human renal artery (after own observations) (doctoral thesis) (1939).

• About the position of the bifurcation of the aorta (1940).

• About the collection "Valsamaki" (July 1940).

• Rare periptosis doubling of the inferior vena cava met'aplasias the right kidney and ureter (March 1949).

• About the doubling of the central channel (Rolandi) of the human brain. (September 1949).

• On the formation of human nerve plexus (October 1949).

• Anatomy Notes (three issues summary Anatomy).

• Human Anatomy Courses (three-volume textbook teaching Mimeographed) (1951).

• Faseranalyse des fasciculus longitudinalis medialis (1954).

• Periptosis front duo (1955).

• Periptosis thorakopagous (1955).

• Rarely periptosis left inferior vena cava. Bumpy ekfysis the right subclavian artery and both carotids (1955).

• Human Anatomy in four volumes (Volume 1st, 1957).

• On the so-called "pre-sacral nerve." Contribution to the study of the pelvic plexus (1958).

• Human Anatomy in four volumes (2nd Volume, 1958-1961).

• Human Anatomy in four volumes (Volume 3rd, 1967).

• Elements of Human Anatomy (Teaching guide for medical assistants, 1969).

• Compendium of Human Anatomy Atlas (Concise two-volume reference book, 1979).
