= Göçbeyli =

- Neighbourhood
- Location in Turkey Göçbeyli (İzmir)
- Coordinates: 39°13′N 27°24′E
- Country: Turkey
- Province: İzmir
- District: Bergama
- Elevation: 85 m (279 ft)
- Population (2022): 1,549
- Time zone: UTC+3 (TRT)
- Postal code: 35700
- Area code: 0232

Göçbeyli is a neighbourhood in the municipality and district of Bergama, İzmir Province, Turkey. Its population is 1,549 (2022). Before the 2013 reorganisation, it was a town (belde). It is situated to the north of Bakır River. The distance to Bergama is 20 kilometres (12 mi) and to İzmir is 125 kilometres (78 mi).

The oldest inscription in the settlement is dated 1214 (Islamic calendar, 1799 AD). But it is believed that the settlement was founded much before this date by a nomadic Turkmen tribe named Sarıkoyunlu which decided to settle. The name of the settlement refers to nomadic era of the tribe (göç means "migrate" and bey means "lord") In 1975, Göçbeyli was declared a seat of township. The town economy depends on agriculture. Industrial plants, fruits and cereals are among the town products.
