= Tepeköy, Bergama =

Tepeköy
- Neighbourhood
- Location in Turkey Tepeköy (İzmir)
- Coordinates: 39°05′N 27°07′E
- Country: Turkey
- Province: İzmir
- District: Bergama
- Elevation: 55 m (180 ft)
- Population (2022): 1,210
- Time zone: UTC+3 (TRT)
- Postal code: 35700
- Area code: 0232

Tepeköy is a neighbourhood in the municipality and district of Bergama, İzmir Province, Turkey. Its population is 1,210 (2022). It is situated at the northern banks of Bakırçay river and south west of Bergama.
