= Ayaskent, İzmir =

Ayaskent
- Neighbourhood
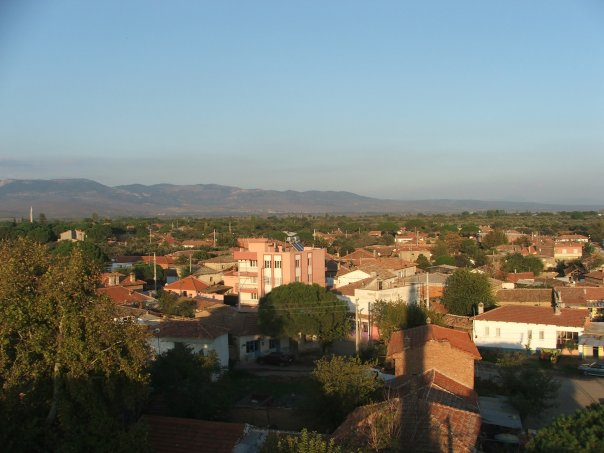

- Location within Turkey Location within İzmir
- Coordinates: 39°11′N 27°20′E
- Country: Turkey
- Province: İzmir
- District: Bergama
- Elevation: 50 m (160 ft)
- Population (2022): 678
- Time zone: UTC+3 (TRT)
- Postal code: 35700
- Area code: 0232

Ayaskent (former Ayasili and Ayasköy) is a neighbourhood in the municipality and district of Bergama, İzmir Province, Turkey. Its population is 678 (2022). Before the 2013 reorganisation, it was a town (belde). It is situated in the northern part of Bergama plains. The distance to Bergama is 15 kilometres (9 mi) and to İzmir is 120 kilometres (75 mi). Ayaskent (then known as Ayasili) was founded during the Ottoman Empire era. In 1976 Ayaskent was declared a seat of township. Main economic activities are agriculture and light industry based on agriculture. Dairy, flour factories, olive press and a cottom gin are some of the industrial workshops of the town.
