= Zeytindağ =

Zeytindağ Kiliseköy
- Neighbourhood
- Location in Turkey Zeytindağ (İzmir)
- Coordinates: 38°58′N 27°04′E
- Country: Turkey
- Province: İzmir
- District: Bergama
- Elevation: 140 m (460 ft)
- Population (2022): 2,669
- Time zone: UTC+3 (TRT)
- Postal code: 35700
- Area code: 0232

Zeytindağ (literally "olive-mountain") is a neighbourhood in the municipality and district of Bergama, İzmir Province, Turkey. Its population is 2,669 (2022). Before the 2013 reorganisation, it was a town (belde). It is situated 4 kilometres (2 mi) east of Aegean Sea side and 5 kilometres (3 mi) south of Bakırçay valley. The distance to Bergama is 25 kilometres (16 mi) and to İzmir is 80 kilometres (50 mi).

== History ==
Zeytindağ history dates back to ancient ages. There are ruins 1 kilometre (0.62 mi) west of Zeytindağ center. These ruins are thought to be of the ancient port city of Elaea. This city was founded before the Ionians settled in Aegean coasts. But it flourished during the kingdom of Pergamon. After the sea shore receded because of the gradual accumulation of alluvial deposit, Elaea lost its former importance.

According to town page the former name of the town in the Medieval ages was Kilisköy or Kiliseköy referring to calcareous soil around the town (Kilis means lime in Ottoman Turkish) In 1909, the town was renamed Reşadiye in the name of the new Ottoman sultan Mehmet V, (also called Reşat) and then Zeytindağ referring to Olive production of the town. (The name Elaea seems to mean olive grove and the present name of the town Zeytindağ means olive mountain.) In 1953, the village was declared a seat of township.
