= Bergama carpet =

Handwoven carpet

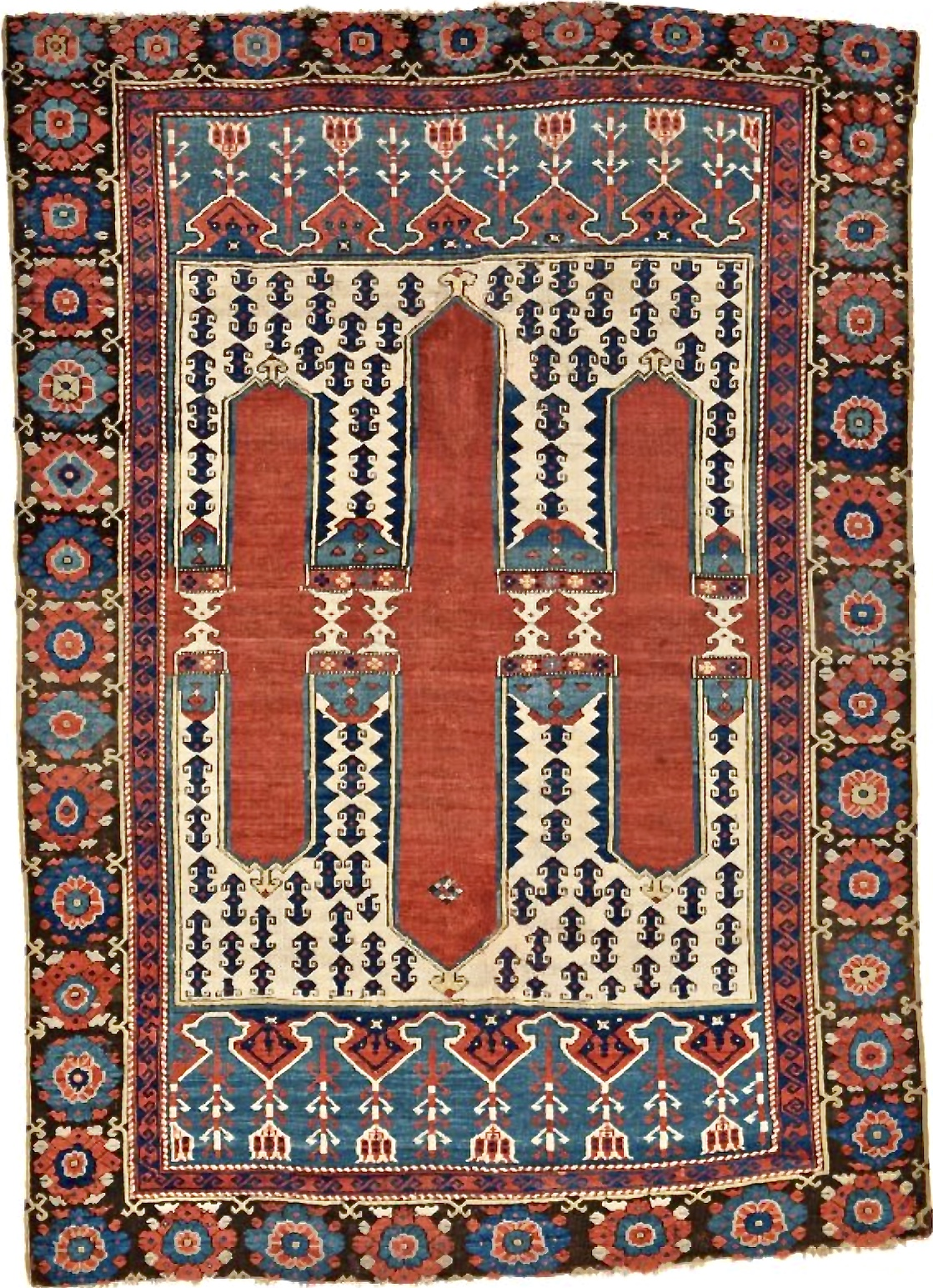
- Bergama rug, first half of 18th century
- Type: Carpet
- Place of origin: Bergama

Bergama Carpet refers to handwoven Turkish carpets, made in the Bergama district in the İzmir Province of northwest Turkey. As a market place for the surrounding villages, the name of Bergama is used as a trade name to define the provenience.

Geographically, the Bergama district includes the regions of Kozak, Yuntağ, Yağcibedir, and Akhizar. Of these, the regions of Yuntağ and Yağcibedir weave carpets which are iconographically different from the Bergama Type.

The Bergama district includes around 70-80 villages, in many of whom carpets are woven. The history of carpet weaving in Bergama probably dates back to the 11th century. Bergama carpets still exist which date from the early 15th century, and are on display in, amongst other museums, the Türk ve Islam Eserleri Müzesi, Istanbul, the Pergamon Museum, Berlin, and the Metropolitan Museum of Art, New York.

== Manufactured, "village", and "nomadic" carpets ==
Bergama carpets can be divided into such as produced in manufactures for export, and carpets produced in villages or by nomads for household use, or local sale.

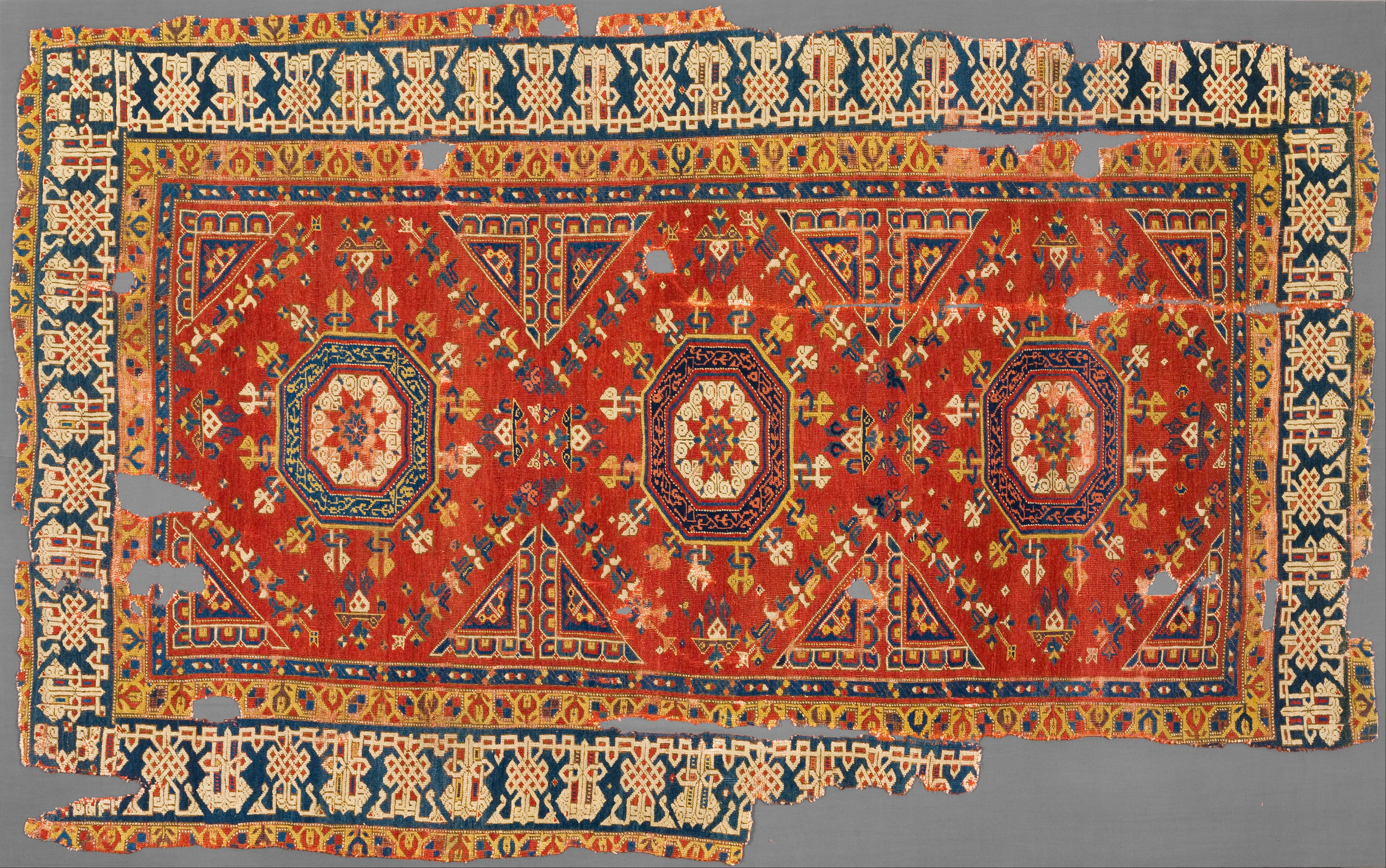
Large pattern 'Holbein' Carpet

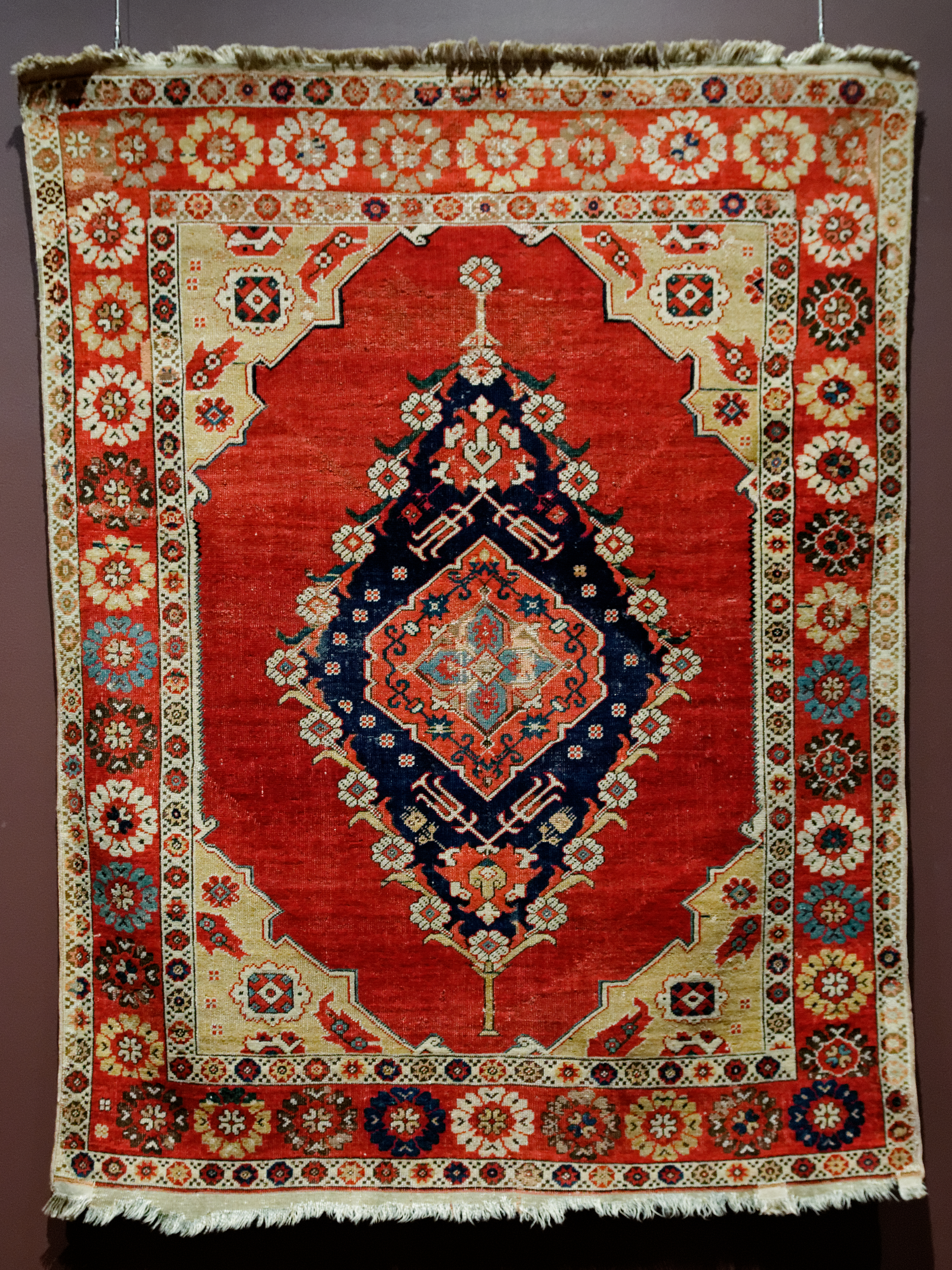
Transsylvanian "double-niche" rug with a predominantly floral patterns

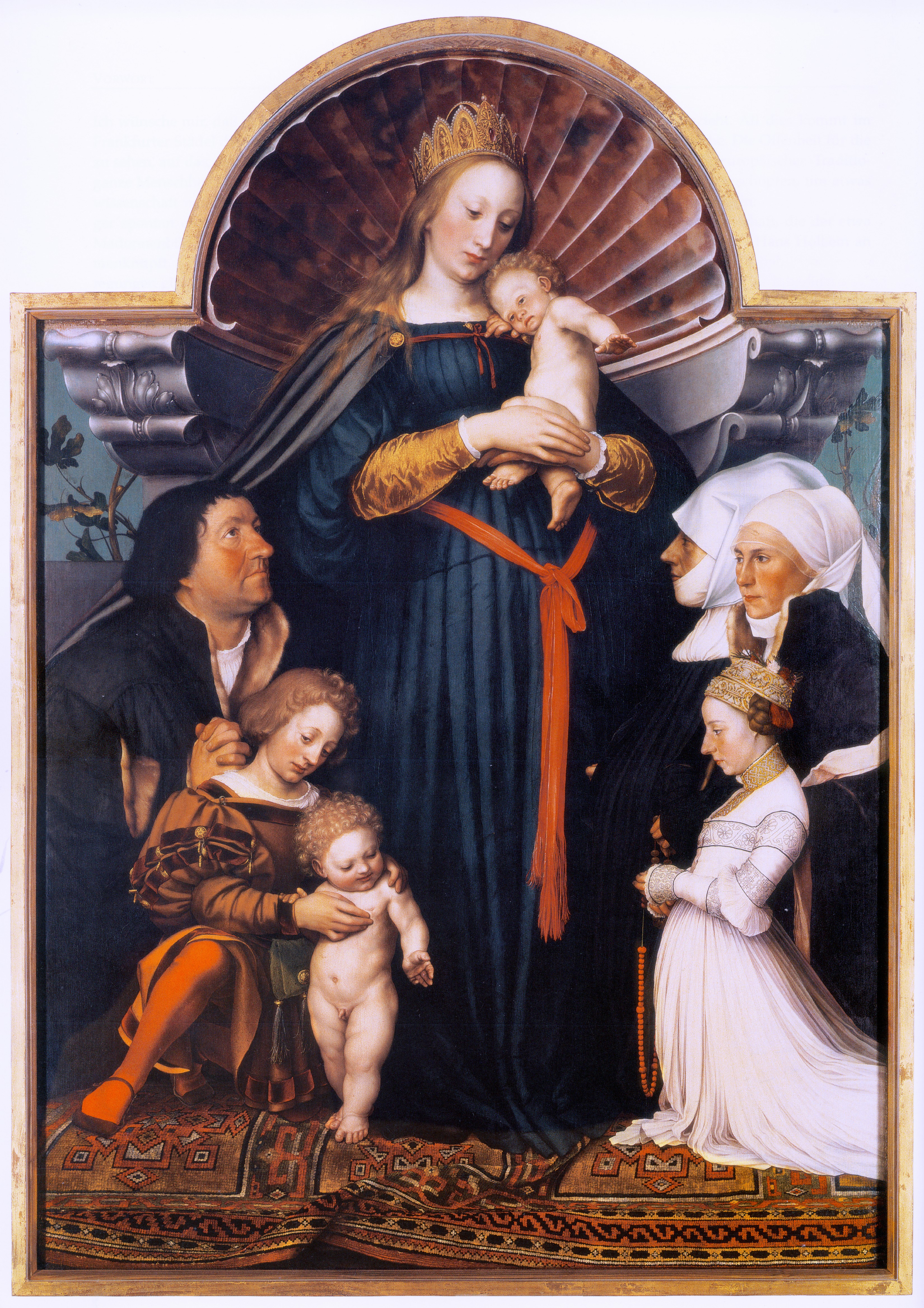
Holbein, The "Darmstadt Madonna" with a large pattern (type III) carpet

Commercial export of Anatolian carpets to Europe is documented since the 15th century. By this time, oriental carpets begin to appear in Renaissance paintings. The best known carpet type woven for export which is attributed to the Bergama region is the so-called "large pattern Holbein Type", or Holbein Type III. Carpets of this type were painted by Hans Holbein the Younger in his works The Ambassadors, and the "Darmstadt" Madonna. Turkish carpets found in Transsylvanian churches were dated back to the 15th century. By their design and structural details some of these carpets were likely woven in Bergama.

Interest in village carpet weaving as a distinct form of art has grown since the 1980s, when projects like the DOBAG Carpet Initiative revived the art of weaving carpets from handspun wool, dyed with traditional vegetal dyes. A branch of the DOBAG project was set up in the Yuntdağ region.

A central medaillon consisting of large, concentrically reduced rhomboid patterns with latch-hook ornaments is often seen in Bergama carpets. This pattern is associated with the Yörük nomads of Anatolia.

== Iconography ==
Iconographically, the patterns of the Bergama village carpets can be divided into two main groups:

- The "Caucasian" type with large, geometric shapes, is considered to be of Caucasian or Turkoman origin.
- The "Turkish" type, mainly with floral motivs, flowers and leaves in the field. The Kiz Bergama "bridal" carpet is exemplary for a "Turkish" design.

The different types likely originate from design traditions introduced by ethnic migrants at different times. People of Caucasian origin were already living in the Bergama region, when Orhan Gazi occupied the Bergama territory (then, Karesi province) in AD 1336/AH 735. However, scientific attempts were unsuccessful to attribute a particular design to a specific ethnic, regional, or even nomadic versus village, tradition.

== Technical aspects ==
Bergama carpets are woven with symmetric knots. Warps, wefts and pile are made of sheep wool. The knotting density of around 12 knots per cm^{2} is rather coarse. They are typically three to four meters square in size. Bergama carpets often show nicely woven Kilim ends, sometimes with an integrated pile-woven pattern.
