= Bettie de Jong =

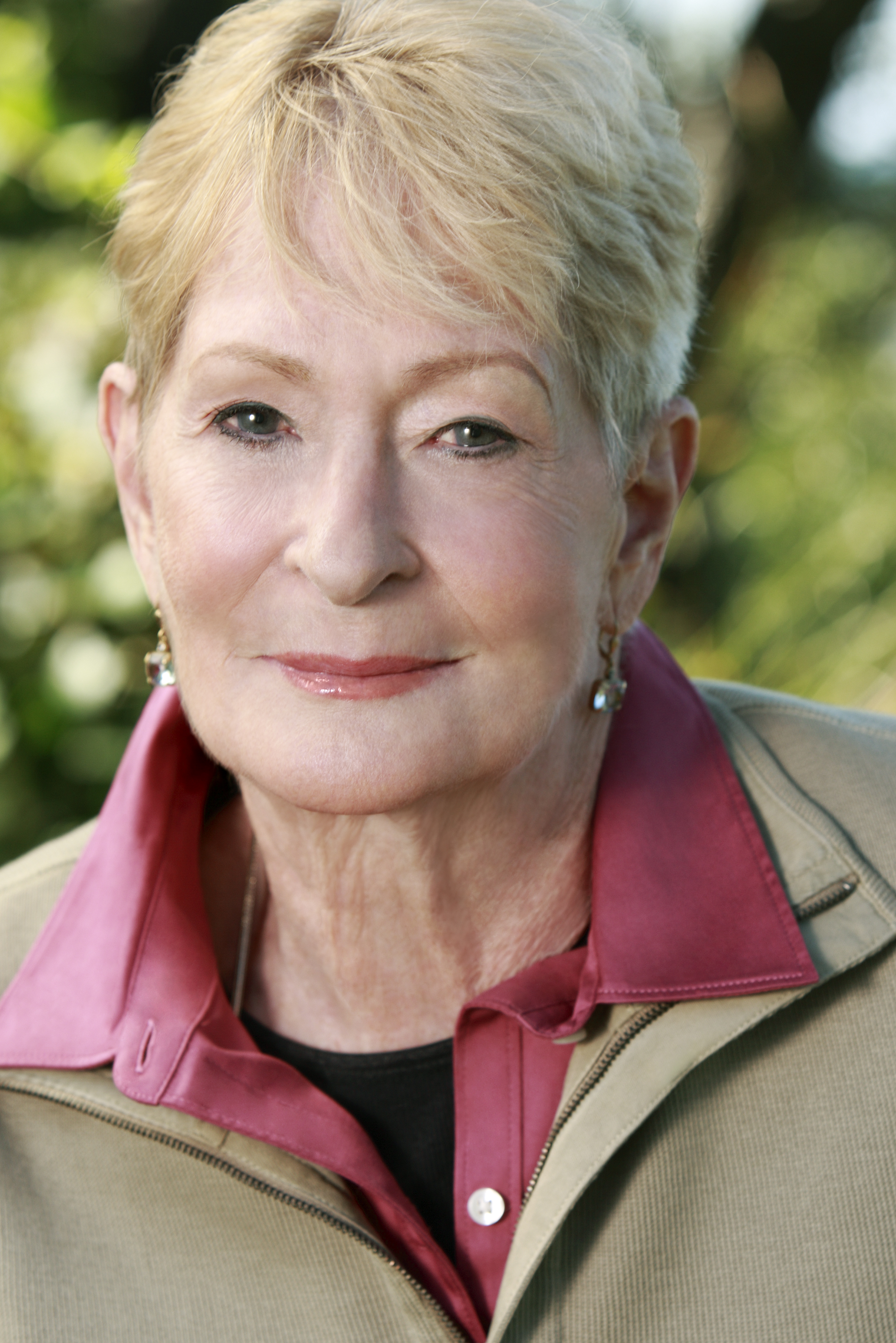
Bettie de Jong

Bettie de Jong (born May 1, 1933 in Sumatra, Indonesia) is a Dutch rehearsal director and former lead dancer at the Paul Taylor Dance Company. In November 2007, she received the Dance Magazine Award to recognize her contributions to dance.

== Early years ==
De Jong was born in Tanjungbalai on Sumatra and moved to the Netherlands in 1946. After Indonesia she continued her early training in dance and mime in Wageningen. De Jong lived for more than 35 years with her husband Victor Laredo.

== Career ==
Her first professional engagement was with the Netherlands Pantomime Company. After coming to New York in 1958 to study at the Martha Graham Center of Contemporary Dance, she performed with the Martha Graham Dance Company, the Pearl Lang Dance Theater, John Butler and Lucas Hoving and was seen on CBS with Rudolf Nureyev in a duet choreographed by choreographer Paul Tayor.

== Paul Taylor Dance Company ==
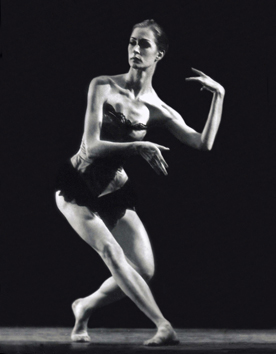
Bettie de Jong Piece Period 1962 PTDC

Bettie de Jong joined the Taylor Company in 1962. Noted for her strong stage presence, she was Paul Taylor's favorite dancing partner, and, as rehearsal director, was his right arm for 35 years. De Jong finished her active dancing career in 1985. During those years, Paul Taylor created 24 dances for her, including:

- Tracer
- Piece Period
- La Negra
- Scudorama
- Party Mix
- The Red Room
- 9 Dances With Music by Corelli
- From Sea To Shining Sea
- Post Meridian
- Orbs
- Lento
- Public Domain
- Churchyard
- Foreign Exchange
- Big Bertha
- Book of Beasts
- Fetes
- Guests of May
- Noah's Minstrels
- American Genesis
- Esplanade
- Cloven Kingdom
- Le Sacre du Printemps (The Rehearsal)
- House of Cards

== Nine Variations on a Dance Theme ==
In Nine Variations on a Dance Theme from 1966/1967, filmed by Hilary Harris, de Jong performed the same dance nine times, starting and ending in a recline position. The film was shown at the Museum of Modern Art for many years as an example of dance filmmaking.
