= Victor Laredo =

American photographer, artist, and curator

- Born: 1910; Bergama, İzmir Province, Turkey
- Died: 2003 (aged 92–93)
- Known for: Photography

Victor Laredo (1910–2003) was an American documentary photographer and author. His black and white photographs of New York City were the subject of the books New York: People and Places (1964), New York City: A Photographic Portrait, and Central Park: A Photographic Guide. Laredo's architectural photographs were published in Life Magazine and became a fourth book entitled Sephardic Spain, written by Laredo and including the architectural photographs.

Laredo exhibited at the Museum of Modern Art the Museum of the City of New York, the Jewish Museum (New York), and the Brooklyn Museum.

== Family background ==
Victor Laredo's family lived in Pergamon, Asia Minor, during the last days of the Ottoman Empire (modern Bergama, İzmir Province, Turkey). Pergamon is famous for its Greco-Roman ruins and is reputed to have hosted the second largest library of antiquity, after Alexandria. The Laredo family was of Spanish Jewish descent, having lived as secret Jews under the Spanish Inquisition for nearly 200 years. They left Spain in the late 1600s and moved to Tangiers, North Africa, branching off into Asia Minor in the 18th century.

== Early life ==
Laredo was the oldest of three siblings born to Morris and Anna Laredo. Morris was an inspector of weights and measures in the service of the Sultan of the Ottoman Empire. After the first world war ended and the Ottoman Empire collapsed, the Laredo family emigrated to the United States in 1920, entering through Ellis Island, New York. They settled in New Brunswick, New Jersey where Morris became a successful insurance salesman.

== Later life ==
=== 1930s ===
By 1930, Laredo was estranged from his family because of his father's conservative beliefs that conflicted with Victor's artistic aspirations and left wing political convictions. Moving to New York City, Victor attended the National Academy of Art and Design becoming a painter. He was an art teacher, under the Works Progress Administration (WPA) program, at the 96th Street YMCA with follow instructor and friend Zero Mostel.

=== 1940s ===
Joining the United States Merchant Marine in 1940, Laredo traveled the world while painting in his spare time. Upon the outbreak of World War II, he continued his service with the United States Merchant Marine, and returned to New York City after the war ended. In 1946, after losing his lifetime work of paintings in a house fire, he gave up painting and, in early 1947, began to photograph in New York City. One of his earliest photographs was a portrait of Cuban artist Carmen Herrera In 1948, Laredo met with Edward Steichen, then the curator of photography at the Museum of Modern Art. Steichen bought the portrait of Herrera and included it in his upcoming show "In And Out Of Focus" the Museum of Modern Art on April 7, 1948.

=== 1950s ===
The Brooklyn Museum mounted a solo show of Laredo's photographs from September 12 to October 23, 1950.

During the 1950s, Laredo was accepting commissions from Harper's Bazaar, Charm, Seventeen, the U.S. Camera Annual, and Helena Rubinstein. Between jobs, Laredo began his work to document New York City, shooting with medium and large format cameras. In 1954, he took a studio space on the top floor of 10 East 8th Street in Greenwich Village. Around the corner, on University Avenue, was Cedar Tavern, the hangout for most of the painters that became known as the New York School. He was a frequent patron and met his future wife Carolynn Malarelli (Lynn Laredo). Their only child, Andre Laredo, was born on May 31, 1956.

=== 1960s ===
By the early 1960s, Laredo began documenting architectural details of older buildings in New York City, convinced that old-world craftsmanship was being replaced by modern architecture at an alarming pace. He presented the idea for a book project to the Reinhold publishing company. They suggested another idea, documenting the city as a whole entity. Laredo agreed to the project and, in 1961, began shooting the city full time resulting in his first book, New York: People and Places (1964).

In 1965, Laredo accepted a commission from Life Magazine International to document the architectural remains of Spanish Jewish culture in Spain. After two years of research including several trips to Spain, the article appeared in the August 4, 1967 edition of Life Magazine International. Laredo's work was featured in the 1967 photographic exhibition "Sephardic Spain" which was held at the Jewish Museum in New York City. The exhibition was also featured on the CBS television program Look Up and Live.

After his marriage failed with Lynn, Laredo met Bettie de Jong in 1968, principal dancer and rehearsal mistress for the Paul Taylor Dance Company. The two lived together as husband and wife for over 35 years until Victor's death in 2003.

=== 1970s ===
The 1970s saw the publication of three books by Laredo, New York City: A Photographic Portrait (1973), Sephardic Spain (1978), and Central Park: A Photographic Guide (1979). Laredo created a vocational training program in Spanish Harlem in the late 1970s providing photographic technicians to the industry.

== Return to painting and death ==
After the age of 70, Laredo returned to painting. He continued photographing as well, spending several years shooting in Central Park, and working on a handmade camera project until his death in 2003. His son Andre R. Laredo who was a renown analogue printer and photographer died in December 2022. He is survived by a granddaughter.

== Surviving painting ==
The only known surviving painting by Laredo titled On the Beach was painted for the WPA in the 1940s and is held by the Schomburg Center for Research in Black Culture.
