= Elaea (Aeolis) =

Ancient town of Aeolis, Turkey

Elaea Ancient Greek: Ἐλαία and Ἐλέα
- Ancient city
- Location within Turkey Aegean
- Coordinates: 38.95°N 27.04°E
- Country: Turkey
- Province: İzmir Province
- District: Aliağa District
- Founder: Menestheus

Elaea (Ancient Greek: Ἐλαία and Ἐλέα) was an ancient city of Aeolis, Asia, the port of Pergamum. According to the Barrington Atlas of the Greek and Roman World, it was located near the modern town of Zeytindağ, İzmir Province, Turkey. The ruins of the silted port's breakwater can be seen on satellite maps at 38°56'35.54"N 27°2'16.34"E.

According to a text by Stephanus of Byzantium, it was also called Cidaenis (Ancient Greek: Κιδαινίς), and was founded by Menestheus; but it seems likely that there is some error in the reading Cidaenis.

== History ==
Strabo places Elaea south of the river Caicus, 12 stadia from the river, and 120 stadia from Pergamum. The Caicus enters a bay, which was called Elaiticus Sinus, or the bay of Elaea. Strabo calls the bay of Elaea part of the Bay of Adramyttium, but incorrectly. He has the story, which Stephanus has taken from him, that Elaea was a settlement made by Menestheus and the Athenians with him, who joined the war against Troy; but Strabo does not explain how it could be an Aeolian city, if this story was true. Elaea minted coins, which bear the head and name of Menestheus. Some argue that these are some evidence of its Athenian origin; but others, including William Smith discount the connection. Herodotus does not name Elaea among the Aeolian cities. Strabo makes the bay of Elaea terminate on one side in a point called Hydra, and on the other in a promontory Harmatus; and he estimates the width between these points at 80 stadia. Thucydides (viii. 101) places Harmatus opposite to Methymna, from which, and the rest of the narrative, it is clear that he fixes Harmatus in a different place from Strabo. The exact site of Elaea seems to be uncertain. William Martin Leake, in his map, fixes it at a place marked Kliseli, on the road from the south to Pergamum. Scylax (p. 35), Pomponius Mela (i. 18), Pliny (v. 32), and Ptolemy (v. 2), all of whom mention Elaea, do not help us to the precise place; all we learn from them is, that the Caicus flowed between Pitane and Elaea.

The name of Elaea occurs in the history of the kings of Pergamum. According to Strabo, from Livy (xxxv. 13), travellers who would reach Pergamum from the sea, would land at Elaea. One of the passages of Livy shows that there was a small hill (tumulus) near Elaea, and that the town was in a plain and walled. Elaea was damaged by an earthquake in the reign of Trajan, at the same time that Pitane suffered.

It is also mentioned in the Delphic Theorodochoi inscription.

It was a member of the Delian League.

Pausanias write that at Elaea there was the tomb of Thersander, son of Polynices, who was killed by Telephus during the Trojan War.

At Olympia, there was a statue of a young beardless Zeus which was dedicated by the citizens of Elaea.

Alkidamas (Ἀλκιδάμας) was a philosopher from Elaea.

Diodorus (Διόδωρος) of Elaea was a poet.
