= Bölcek, İzmir =

Bölcek
- Neighbourhood
- Location in Turkey Bölcek (İzmir)
- Coordinates: 39°11′N 27°26′E
- Country: Turkey
- Province: İzmir
- District: Bergama
- Elevation: 60 m (200 ft)
- Population (2022): 1,004
- Time zone: UTC+3 (TRT)
- Postal code: 35700
- Area code: 0232

Bölcek is a neighbourhood in the municipality and district of Bergama, İzmir Province, Turkey. Its population is 1,004 (2022). Before the 2013 reorganisation, it was a town (belde). It is situated in the northern part of Bergama plains. The distance to Bergama is 30 kilometres (19 mi) and to İzmir is 135 kilometres (84 mi).
