= Cecile Hoover Edwards =

African American nutritional researcher

- Born: Cecile Annette Hoover; October 26, 1926; East Saint Louis, Illinois
- Died: September 17, 2005 (aged 78); Washington, D.C.
- Education: B.A., nutritional chemistry, Tuskegee Institute; M.A., organic chemistry, Tuskegee Institute; PhD, nutrition, Iowa State University
- Known for: Nutritional research for low-income and African American people
- Spouse: Dr. Gerald Alonzo Edwards
- Children: 3
- Scientific career
- Fields: Nutrition
- Institutions: North Carolina A&T State University; Howard University
- Thesis: "Utilization of Nitrogen by the Animal Organism" (1950)

Cecile Hoover Edwards (October 26, 1926 – September 17, 2005) was an American nutritional researcher whose career focused on improving the nutrition and well-being of disadvantaged people. Her scientific focus was on finding low-cost foods with an optimal amino acid composition, with a special interest in methionine metabolism. She was also a university administrator, serving as dean of several schools within Howard University between 1974 and 1990.

She was cited by the National Council of Negro Women for outstanding contributions to science. She also received three citations from the Illinois House of Representatives for devotion to the cause of eliminating poverty. She was honored by the State of Illinois on April 5, 1984, with the declaration of that day as "Dr. Cecile Hoover Edwards Day."

== Early life and education ==
Cecile Annette Hoover was born in East Saint Louis, Illinois, on October 26, 1926. Her father, Ernest Hoover, managed an insurance company, and her mother, Annie Jordan, was a schoolteacher.

She graduated from high school at age 15 and went to Tuskegee Institute, where she graduated in 1946 with a bachelor's degree in nutritional chemistry. She continued at Tuskegee, doing research on the animal source of protein for which received a master's degree in organic chemistry in 1947, before her twenty-first birthday.

She received her Ph.D. in nutrition from Iowa State University in 1950, submitting her dissertation on "Utilization of Nitrogen by the Animal Organism: Influence of caloric intake and methionine supplementation on the protein metabolism of albino rats fed rations low in nitrogen and containing various proportions of fat."

== Academic career ==
Edwards became an assistant professor of Foods and Nutrition at Tuskegee from 1950 to 1952, and was promoted to Head of Department from 1952 to 1956. During this time, she was also a research associate for the Carver Foundation. In 1956, she moved to North Carolina A&T State University, where she taught Nutrition and research until 1971. She worked as Head of Home Economics Department from 1968 to 1971.

In 1971 she moved to Howard University in Washington, D.C., serving as professor of Nutrition and continuing economics. During her tenure there, she was Dean of the School of Human Ecology for 13 years, dean of the School of Continuing Education, and interim dean of the College of Pharmacy, Nursing and Allied Health Sciences, and established a doctoral program in nutrition at Howard. In 1978 she received a Ford Foundation fellowship to act as a nutritional consultant at the University of Khartoum. She returned to Howard University to serve as Dean of the School of Human Ecology from 1974 until her retirement in 1990.

While acting as dean, she concurrently oversaw a 5-year program that focused on the pregnancies of low-income women; more specifically, Edwards was interested in how these pregnancies were affected by socioeconomic and nutritive factors. Finally, Edwards is credited with establishing Howard University's first PhD program in nutrition; this occurred during her time as part of the school's faculty.

== Research ==
=== Low-cost dietary supplements ===
Much of Edwards' career focused on the eating habits of pregnant African-American women. In a paper that was published in May 1953, Edwards partook in a study that attempted to analyze the effects of dietary supplements during the pregnancies of anemic women. The women were given either high mineral, high protein or high vitamin supplements. Results showed that women across all three conditions in study were showing the recommended intake levels of calories, proteins, calcium, iron, vitamin A and riboflavin. Moreover, these women also had higher red blood cell counts as well as hemoglobin concentrations, following the study. Several correlative conclusions were drawn, among them that the occurrences of birth-related complications in pregnant women with poor diets were higher than in pregnant women who had better diets. Additionally, good diets were correlated with an increase in infant length and weight. Edwards noted that the dietary supplements used in this experiment were both relatively inexpensive and common. She suggested that pregnant women of lower incomes maintain a highly nutritive diet based on these cheap and available foods.

Another key point of Edward's focus was on the amino acid composition of foods, especially vegetables, with the goal of finding low-cost foods that were optimal for protein production. Based on a study performed in India, where school children who consumed dietary supplements of the aforementioned nature had favorable gains in height, weight and hemoglobin, Edwards oversaw a similar experiment in Alabama. School children received low-cost dietary supplements within their school lunches, and over a six-month period, their heights, weights and scholastic scores were recorded. In order to calculate the nutritive value of the meals the children were eating, nutrients such as protein, calcium, vitamin A and vitamin D were measured. Children who received dietary supplements showed a considerable increase in the majority of these nutrients, and also received higher academic evaluations from their teachers; they were more alert and paid better attention, for example.

=== Methionine and other proteins ===
She had a particular interest in the metabolism of the amino acid methionine, and starting in the 1950s, led an 18-year study for the National Institutes of Health on this topic. In addition to that, Edwards was interested in postoperative dieting, due to the loss of tissue protein that is observed during surgeries. She was involved in a study that measured how well following surgery adult rats were able to absorb methionine (whose methyl group is used in a variety of biological functions). Ultimately, the rats that underwent surgery had a smaller uptake of methionine, specifically in the tissues that had been affected during the surgery. Moreover, Edwards observed that in the two weeks following surgery, the radio labeled plasma and tissue proteins in the rats showed greater activity by the alpha carbon of the methionine, as opposed to the methyl carbon.

In the late 1980s Edwards studied historical dietary patterns in the South, identifying inexpensive traditional dishes that were sources of protein, and developing nutrition plans reducing the amount of fat in African-American cuisine. She oversaw a study that assessed amino acid quality, nitrogen, and moisture content in a variety of common foods such as flour, cream cheese and lima beans. The purpose of this experiment was to suggest dietary complementation of particular foods, such that a consumer was focusing not just on overall high amino acid intake, but also on the quality of intake. For this reason, cystine and tyrosine quantities were studied as well, because the two share similar biological characteristics with methionine and phenylalanine, respectively. Acid hydrolyzates as well as microbiological assays were used in the quantification of amino acid content in the foods. Edwards observed differences in amino acid content between similar foods; for example, she found that bologna contained more amino acids than frankfurters and that lima beans had more cysteine and valine than pork and beans. The purpose of this study, Edwards noted, was to provide knowledge on amino acid content, such that people can consciously pair certain foods together for optimal intake.

Edwards also partook in a study that assessed the extent to which the body responds to lacking amounts of necessary proteins via intake. The results supported the conclusion that the body compensates for how much protein is added; for example, when the minimal protein intake was met, the body responded by conserving methionine catabolism. And additionally, when certain amino acids were lacking, they were synthesized as well as reused, in lieu of excretion. Edwards concluded overall that around 46 grams of protein a day are required in the continued maintenance of the adult male. She also made note that wheat-based diets do provide adequate dietary supplementation, which is an important conclusion given that the geography of various places in the world cause those places to be heavily wheat-based.

Edwards opposed hereditarian positions in the nature and nurture debate such as those of Arthur Jensen which credited genes as the dominant factor in intelligence; she concluded that social and environmental factors were at least as responsible as heredity in influencing intelligence. Furthermore, Edwards worked to spread knowledge about issues such as childcare and financial budgeting to lower income and disadvantaged populations.

=== Social factors in health ===
In a review Edwards published in 1995, she introduced a concept of population approach, which she believed was how the medical system should treat patients, by viewing and taking into account their social, economic and cultural environments. Moreover, she looked specifically into hypertension within the Black American demographic, and named weight control, reduced sodium chloride intake and physical activities as ways of prevention. At the same time, she cited social factors as possible causes for the higher hypertension rates among Black Americans than among White Americans. For example, Edwards noted that generally and comparatively, Black Americans were more likely to be poor and more likely to live farther from medical treatment. Additionally, she stated that Black Americans suffered from greater psychosocial stress and other social strains due to racism, and that these factors and their correlation towards hypertension required further research.

== Further work ==
Edwards was a nutritional consultant and was also a member of numerous government committees and panels, including those convened by the National Institutes of Health, the United States Department of Agriculture, and the 1969 White House Conference on Food, Nutrition and Health. She authored 160 research papers, and co-authored a 1991 book, Human Ecology: Interaction of Man With His Environments. The publication of one of her articles, titled Nutrition, Other Factors, and the Outcomes of Pregnancy, resulted in the National Institute of Health allotting her a $4.6 million grant; further research concerning this subject was performed at Howard University.

== Personal life ==
In 1952 she married Gerald Alonzo Edwards, a physical chemist with whom she collaborated on many research projects, and who predeceased her by three months. They had three children.

She died on September 17, 2005, in Washington Home Hospice. She is buried in Mount Hope Cemetery, Raleigh, Wake County, North Carolina, US.

== Bibliography ==
- Hoover, Cecile Annette (1950). Utilization of nitrogen by the animal organism: V. Influence of caloric intake and methionine-supplementation on the protein metabolism of albino rats fed rations low in nitrogen and containing varying proportions of fat. PhD Dissertation: Iowa State University.
- Human Ecology: Interaction of Man With His Environments. Kendall Hunt Publishing Company. 1991. ISBN 978-0-8403-6651-1.
- Quality of Life: Black Families. Howard University. 1991.
