= Oriental Carpet Manufacturers =

- Type: Limited company
- Industry: Manufacturing
- Predecessor: P. De Andria & Company; Habif & Polako; T. A. Spartali & Company; G.P. & J. Baker Ltd; Sydney La Fontaine; Sykes & Co.
- Founded: December 16, 1907; 118 years ago in London, United Kingdom (officially)
- Defunct: 1986
- Fate: Sold
- Successor: Eastern Kayam Company
- Headquarters: Smyrna, Ottoman Empire
- Key people: AC Edwards
- Products: Oriental carpets
- Number of employees: over 50000 workers (1909)

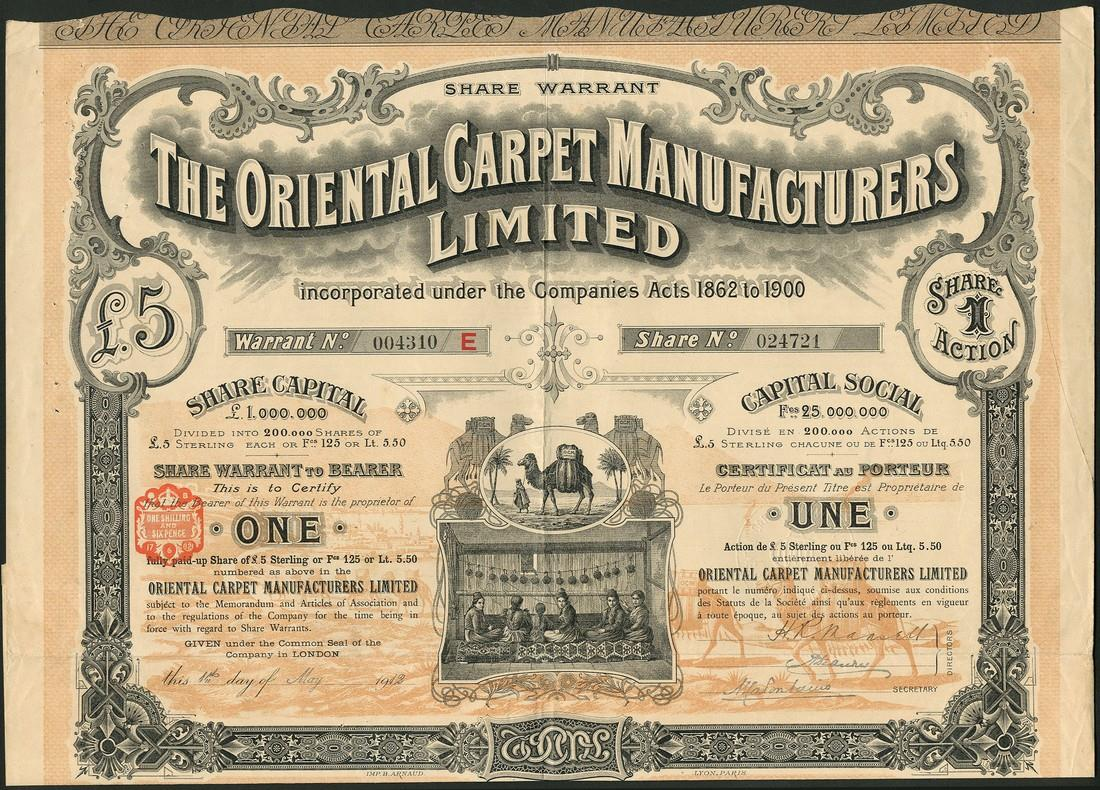
Stock certificate of Oriental Carpet Manufacturers Ltd., 1912.

The Oriental Carpet Manufacturers (OCM) Limited (Turkish: Şark Halı Kumpanyası) was a Smyrna-based company involved in the production of, and trade with, Oriental carpets. Established in 1907 in London, the company set up and controlled their own carpet manufactures in the central Anatolian region around the town of Konya, and from 1911 onwards, in the Hamadan Province in northwestern Iran. In 1983 it was sold, and merged with one of its former affiliates, the Eastern Kayam Company. From 1924 until 1948, OCM was led by Arthur Cecil Edwards, who, after retiring, wrote a text book on Persian carpets, which is still in print today.

== Historical background ==
Rugs were traditionally woven in Anatolia. Surviving carpets in Anatolian mosques have been dated back to the 13th century Seljuk Sultanate of Rum. Their depiction in a large number of Renaissance paintings demonstrates that carpets and rugs were already exported to Western Europe from the 14th century onwards, where they were regarded as highly prestigious luxury goods. With the beginning of the Industrial Revolution, the number of people increased in the Western world who could afford buying oriental rugs. The regions around the towns of Konya and Uşak were the traditional centers of carpet manufacturing in the Ottoman Empire. Until 1870–1880, about 75% of all carpets exported to Western Europe were manufactured in these regions. The Ottoman government promoted the commercial production and export of rugs by setting up rug exhibitions, quality controls, and by establishing schools of arts and crafts in Konya and Kırşehir.

As the demand increased by around 1830, Ottoman as well as European and U.S. American trading corporations expanded their commercial activities. European trading companies in Istanbul and Smyrna established their own manufacturing facilities in competition to the traditional Ottoman rug trading organizations based in Uşak. These companies provided the materials, such as pre-dyed yarns, and issued detailed instructions about the patterns to be woven according to the buyers' taste and market demand. Carpets were woven either by home workers, or in workshops. Working conditions and wages were poor even at that time. Workers in the OCM workshops were working at faster rates, and had lower wages compared to the Uşak manufacturers. By around 1910, the export from the traditional carpet-producing regions was reduced to merely 10% of the total volume of trade.

== History of the OCM ==
=== Founding and early years ===
The Oriental Carpet Manufacturers Company was officially founded by the amalgamation of six British merchant companies on 16 December 1907 in London. All of the former companies' assets were taken over and rebranded by the OCM on 1 January 1908.

Rumors about a possible monopolisation in the industry appeared in the Smyrniot press as early as February 1907, long before the official founding of the company. Thus, local merchants in Uşak formed the Uşak Ottoman Tapestry Tradehouse (Uşak Osmanlı Halı Ticarethanesi) to compete with the OCM, to no avail.

Despite the fact that the company was registered in the United Kingdom, the company's headquarters and warehouse was located in Smyrna, as well as conducting almost all of its business in the Ottoman Empire. Nevertheless, despite the company's counterclaims, the company was unrecognized by the Ottoman Empire as a legal entity at all and was regarded as in the outside of diplomatic protections. Therefore any litigation involving the company in the Ottoman courts were formed against the local branch managers and related people, who were Ottoman subjects. The company's legal status in the Empire remained unclear until the end of World War I.

The company had bought high-quality wools from the area surrounding Eskişehir -and probably from towns in the Ankara Vilayet and the Konya Vilayet; such as Sivrihisar, Haymana, Cihanbeyli- on its own. The company also bought wools through its agents and independent merchants in Gördes and Demirci, both in the Aidin Vilayet. The company-owned looms and other technical equipment were procured in Germany and Austria. The first company-owned production facilities were set up in the western Anatolian Manisa Province. Already in 1912, OCM controlled the major part of all looms operating in the Konya Vilayet, where 15–20,000 weavers, mostly women, worked at c. 12,000 looms.

In 1911, OCM expanded their activities to Iran. Arthur C. Edwards established a carpet factory in the town of Hamadan, where the production of traditional Persian carpets had totally ceased at that time.

=== After World War I and final years ===
In 1924, Edwards moved to London and became OCM's managing director. He expanded the company's commercial activities in the United States. In order to lower the production costs, he set up factories in India, where wages were lower at that time. OCM shares were still listed at the London Stock Exchange in the 1960s, but came under increasing pressure from other companies which produced low-quality carpets and machine-made rugs at mass-market prices. In 1986, the company was finally dissolved, and sold to the Eastern Kayyam Company, one of its former associates.

== Technical characteristics and pattern designs ==
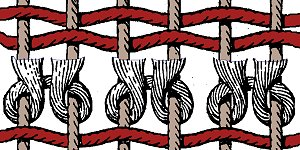
Symmetrical, or "Turkish" carpet knots in a double-wefted foundation (wefts shown in red)

In his textbook on Persian carpets, still famous amongst carpet collectors today, A. C. Edwards has documented how he set up OCM's rug production in the western Iranian town of Hamadan. This region was characterized by a tradition of rural village rug weaving, no rugs were woven in the town itself by 1912. Edwards started with eight looms, set up in a small workshop. By 1948, when Edwards retired, more than 1,000 looms were active in the town, with the largest workshop operating 120 looms. He describes in detail the technical and quality criteria which OCM had defined for their production. Several factors were taken into account: The type of knot which was to be used (i.e., symmetrical or "turkish" vs. asymmetrical or "persian"), the knot density, twisting and thickness of the yarns used for warps, wefts, and pile, the section of appropriate colours, the patterns and motifs of the rug design, always considering the costs of goods and labour.

Edwards opted for a woven foundation with double wefts, similar in structure to the rugs woven in the Kurdish town of Bijar, but with cotton warps and wefts instead of the woolen yarn used in Bijar rugs. The pile was to be knotted with the symmetrical knot, which was traditionally used in the region, and would provide a thicker and heavier pile as compared to asymmetrical knots. A series of prototypes were woven which, as a result, showed that a knot density of 10 x 11 knots per square inch was optimal for weaving a sufficiently dense pattern. High-quality wool was procured from Kurdish nomads from the Kermanshah Province. Initially the wool was carded and spun by hand. Later on, carding was done by a machine, but the yarn was always spun by hand. The yarn was dyed with synthetic dyes, the dyeing process was supervised by an Armenian master who had been trained in Germany. However, the resulting colours were of inferior quality, so the company soon switched to traditional Persian natural dyes. The patterns of the design were derived from classical 16th century Safavid period Persian designs, later to be modified according to the U.S. American buyers' taste. To the resulting product, Edwards gave the trade name "Alvānd" (after the nearby Alvand mountains), in order to distinguish the OCM rug from the traditional rugs woven in the Hamadan province.

== See also ==
- Ziegler & Co.
