= Bergama =

- District and municipality
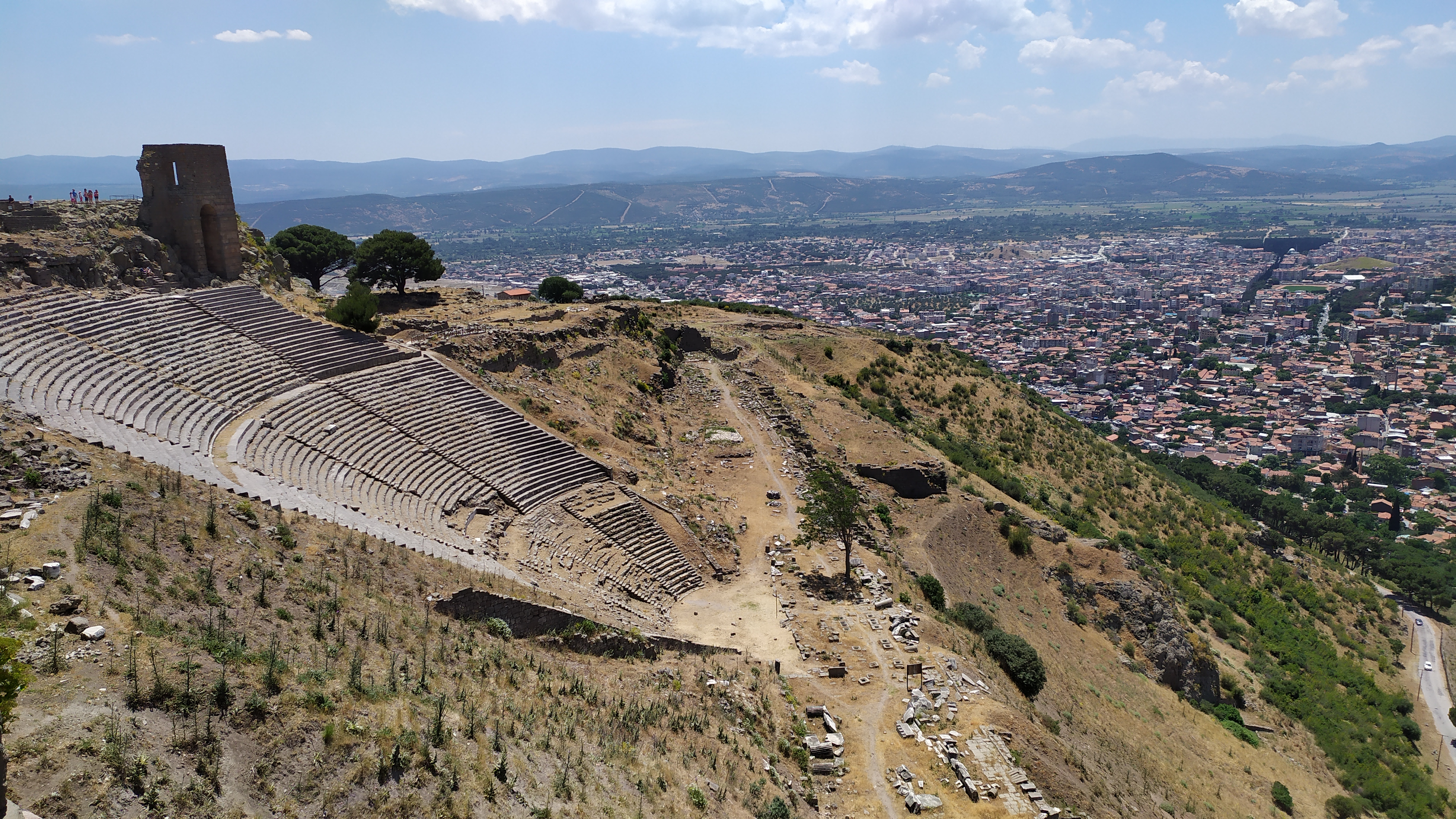
- View of ancient Pergamon theatre and city

- Logo

- Map showing Bergama District in İzmir Province

- Location within Turkey Location within İzmir
- Coordinates: 39°07′N 27°11′E
- Country: Turkey
- Province: İzmir

Government
  - Mayor: Tanju Çelik (CHP)
  - Kaymakam: Avni Oral
- Area: 1,544 km^{2} (596 sq mi)
- Elevation: 68 m (223 ft)
- Population (2022): 105,754
  - Density: 68.49/km^{2} (177.4/sq mi)
- Time zone: UTC+3 (TRT)
- Postal code: 35700
- Area code: 0232
- Website: www.bergama.bel.tr www.bergama.gov.tr

Bergama is a municipality and district of İzmir Province, Turkey, and home to the ancient city of Pergamon. The district has an area of 1,544 km^{2}, and a population of 105,754 (2022). While it is not part of the metropolitan area of the capital city İzmir, it is one of the more populous districts of the province, and is 53.6% urban. Bergama center is situated at a distance of 118 km (73 mi) to the north of the traditional center of İzmir (Konak Square) and 27 km (17 mi) inland from the nearest seacoast, in Dikili.

To the north, Bergama shares a border with three districts of Balıkesir Province, Ayvalık, Burhaniye and İvrindi. To the east, it is bordered by the İzmir Province district of Kınık and the Manisa Province district of Soma. To the south, it is bordered by the Yunusemre district of Manisa, and the İzmir Province district of Aliağa. To the west, it is bordered by the İzmir Province district of Dikili. The district's physical features are determined by the alluvial plain of Bakırçay River.

== Name ==
The name Bergama, as well as its ancient predecessor Pergamon, are thought to be connected with the even more ancient Luwian language adjective "parrai" (Hittite language equivalent; "parku"), meaning "high" in the same vein as being the etymological root of a number of other ancient cities across Anatolia. The ancient and modern Greek language form of the name is Greek: Πέργαμος. In Turkish language, it has been adapted to Bergama. The name of Pergamos derives from Perga (as keramos from kera=earth, clay), although a Turkish author Özhan Öztürk claims that Bergama means "high settlement/base" in Hittite language, while Argoma (modern Suluova) in Amasya means "border settlement" at the Hittite-Kaskian border.

== General features ==
Currently, known for its cotton, gold, and fine carpets, the city was the ancient Greek and Roman cultural center of Pergamon; its wealth of ancient ruins continues to attract considerable tourist interest today, although its famous Temple has been moved to the Pergamon Museum, in Berlin, Germany.

Located on a promontory north of the Bakırçay river, 26 kilometres (16 miles) inland from the Aegean Sea, Bergama has a population of about 102,000. The ruins of the ancient city of Pergamon lie to the north and west of the modern city; Roman Pergamon is believed to have sustained a population of approximately 150,000 at its height in the 1st century AD.

Among Bergama's notable ruins are the Sanctuary of Asclepius (or Asclepeion), a temple dedicated to an ancient Greek god of healing, a Greek Theater, and the Red Basilica complex ("Kızıl Avlu" in Turkish) that straddles the Selinus River, a 2nd-century AD construction likely built by Hadrian. The town also features an archaeological museum.

== History ==
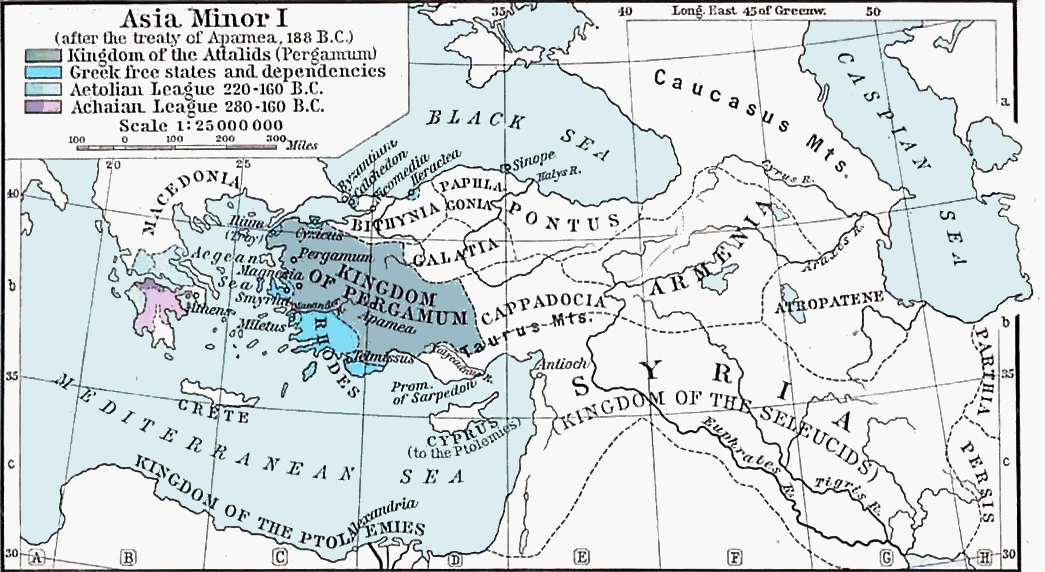
The Attalid kingdom of Pergamon (colored olive) shown at its greatest extent in 188 BC

The city of Pergamon was the capital of the Attalid kingdom from 281 BC to 133 BC and then became part of the Roman province of Asia. It remained under Eastern Roman rule in the Middle Ages except for Sassanid invasion in 620s, Umayyad invasion in 715 and Sultanate of Rum rule between 1074 and 1097.

The Byzantine Empire reasserted its control of the town and it was fortified under the emperor Manuel I Komnenos. It was, however, abandoned by the Byzantines in 1302 and came under the rule of the Turkic Karasid dynasty under the rule of Karasi Bey. After Karasi Bey's death, the beylik was partitioned between his sons and Bergama became the capital of the area under the suzerainty of Yakhshi Khan. It became a part of the Ottoman Empire after his death, possibly in 1341. During Ottoman rule, it was part of the Sanjak of Karesi between until 1868, in Saruhan one (Its centre was Manisa) between 1868 and 1877 and finally in İzmir one. From 1867 until 1922, Bergama was part of Aidin Vilayet and had a mixed population of Turks, Greeks, Armenians and Jews. During the Turkish War of Independence, it was occupied by Greece on June 19, 1919, but came under Turkish control again on September 14, 1922. The Greek Army and Turkish Army burnt down the city while retreating in 1922. The Greek inhabitants were expelled in the population exchange and founded new communities in Lesvos and Gallikos in Greece.

== Climate ==
Bergama has a hot-summer Mediterranean climate (Köppen: Csa), with very hot, dry summers, and cool to mild, moderately wet winters.

Climate data for Bergama (1991–2020)
Month	Jan	Feb	Mar	Apr	May	Jun	Jul	Aug	Sep	Oct	Nov	Dec	Year
Mean daily maximum °C (°F)	11.2 (52.2)	12.7 (54.9)	16.2 (61.2)	21.0 (69.8)	26.7 (80.1)	31.6 (88.9)	34.2 (93.6)	34.2 (93.6)	30.0 (86.0)	24.1 (75.4)	17.8 (64.0)	12.5 (54.5)	22.7 (72.9)
Daily mean °C (°F)	6.8 (44.2)	7.8 (46.0)	10.4 (50.7)	14.5 (58.1)	20.0 (68.0)	24.7 (76.5)	27.4 (81.3)	27.3 (81.1)	23.0 (73.4)	17.8 (64.0)	12.3 (54.1)	8.3 (46.9)	16.7 (62.1)
Mean daily minimum °C (°F)	3.4 (38.1)	4.1 (39.4)	5.8 (42.4)	9.1 (48.4)	13.9 (57.0)	18.2 (64.8)	20.9 (69.6)	21.2 (70.2)	17.2 (63.0)	13.0 (55.4)	8.3 (46.9)	5.1 (41.2)	11.7 (53.1)
Average precipitation mm (inches)	95.76 (3.77)	86.33 (3.40)	64.42 (2.54)	54.19 (2.13)	30.0 (1.18)	16.08 (0.63)	7.88 (0.31)	4.5 (0.18)	17.11 (0.67)	59.34 (2.34)	80.83 (3.18)	103.16 (4.06)	619.6 (24.39)
Average precipitation days (≥ 1.0 mm)	8.2	7.8	6.5	5.9	4.8	3.0	1.5	1.4	2.7	4.8	6.6	9.1	62.3
Average relative humidity (%)	73.1	70.3	66.0	62.2	56.9	51.6	48.1	50.1	55.3	63.9	71.0	74.2	62.0
Source: NOAA

== Sights of interest within Bergama city ==
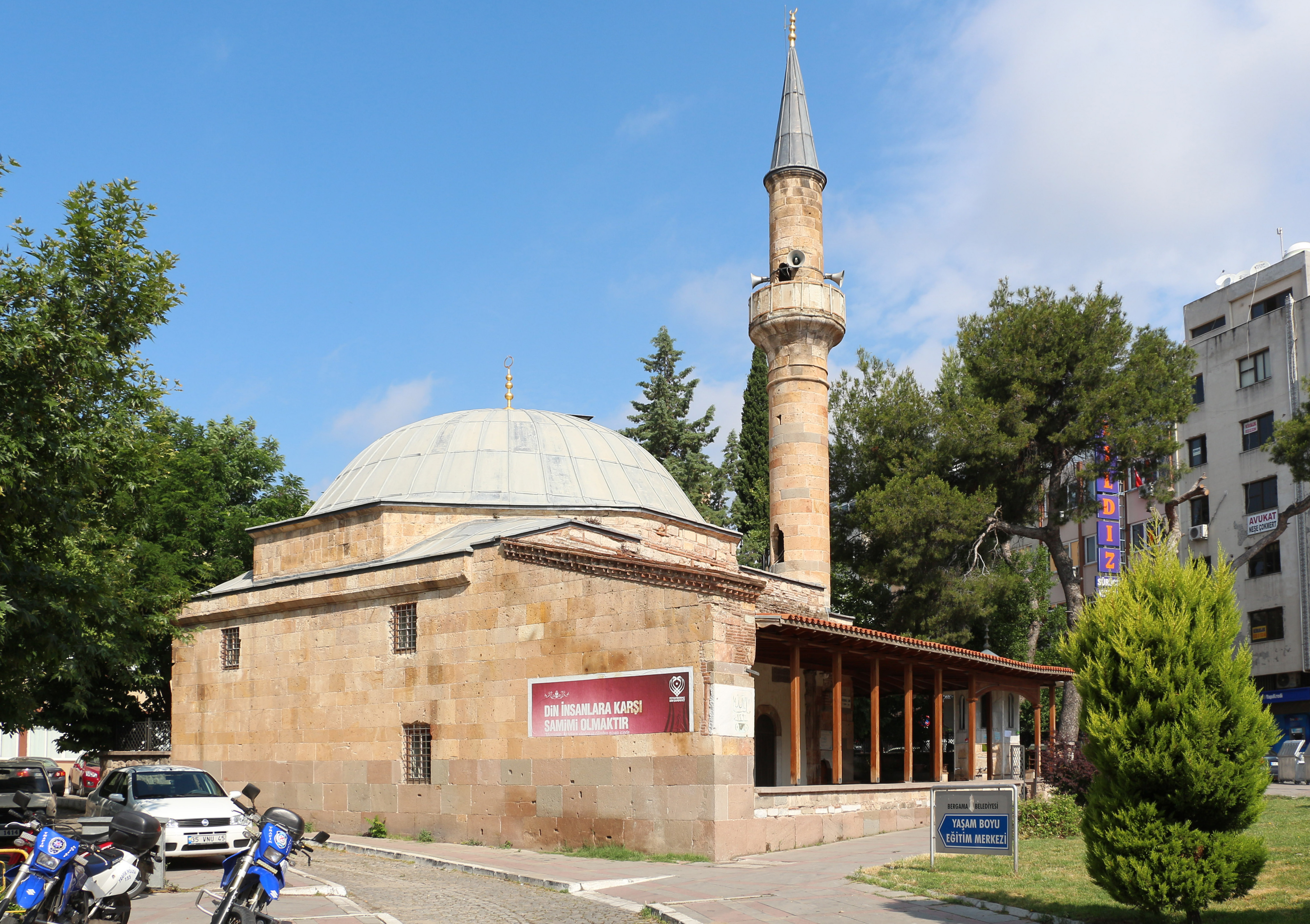
Kursunlu Mosque

- Selçuk Minaret built in the 14th century
- Çukurhan caravanserai built in the 14th century
- Taşhan caravanserai built in 1432
- Great Mosque of Bergama built in 1399
- Şadırvanlı Mosque built in 1550
- Zeus Altar (Now in Berlin Museum)
- Acropolis - accessible by the Bergama Acropolis Gondola from the base station north east of the town
- Asklepion

Bergama is also known for its historic quarter, where old Ottoman houses in the traditional style are found.

=== Historic bridges ===
As an ancient settlement at the northern edge of the Bakırçay River valley, with tributary streams flowing down from the Madra Mountains, Bergama retains many historic bridges.

The area next to the River Selinus (Bergama Çayı) at the base of the Pergamon Massif was developed extensively in Roman times, and the Selinus was canalized to allow construction along the river's course. By the reign of Hadrian (AD 117–138), development was so extensive that the Selinus was enclosed in two long tunnels where it runs in front of the Red Basilica, allowing a huge sacred precinct or temenos, to be built on top. The resulting structure, the Pergamon Bridge (sometimes known as Musluk Köprusu, survives to this day. Each of the tunnels spans 9 m (30 ft); the northern one has a length of 196 m (643 ft) and the southern 185 m (607 ft). The entrance to the structure is at approximately 39°07′23″N 27°10′54″E and the exit at 39°07′17.5″N 27°10′58″E.

Other ancient bridges in Bergama include:

- The Ulucami Bridge, with two unequal spans. 39°07′29″N 27°10′45″E
- The Tabak Bridge, with two roughly equal spans. 39°07′24″N 27°10′53″E
- The Üçkemer Bridge, whose name means "three arches", a longer bridge approached on the south end by a ramp parallel to the river. 39°07′13″N 27°11′03″E

== Allianoi ==
Allianoi is an ancient spa settlement, with remains dating predominantly from the Roman Empire period (2nd century AD) located near the city of Bergama (ancient Pergamon) in Turkey's İzmir Province. The site is at a distance of 18 kilometres (11 miles) to the northeast of Bergama, on the road to the neighboring town of İvrindi.

One particularity of Allianoi is its being a very recent historical discovery. It was mentioned only once in the 2nd century by the orator and medicinal writer Aelius Aristides in his "Hieroi Logoi" (Sacred Tales) (III.1), one of the key sources for the knowledge on the science of healing as it was understood at that time. No other writer of antiquity nor any epigraphic finding known had referred to Allianoi.

== Kozak Plateau ==
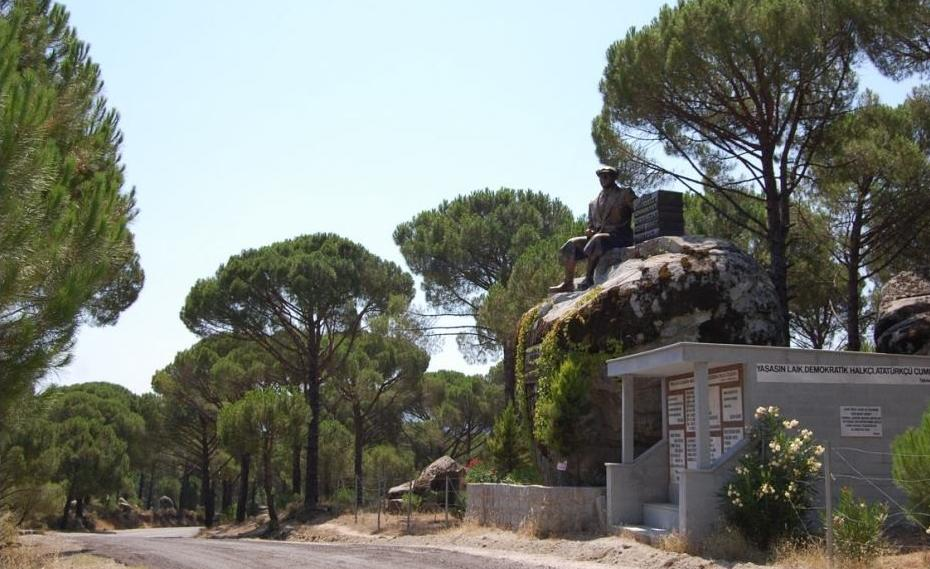
Country road in Kozak Plateau

Kozak Plateau (Kozak Yaylası) is a high plain at an altitude varying between 500 and 1,000 metres (1,600 and 3,300 feet) and starting at a distance of 20 km (12 mi) from Bergama center in the northern direction. The plain is a favorite regional excursion area, famed for its hand-made textile products and pine forests whose pine nut is also extensively exported.

== Ovacık gold mine ==
Recently, Bergama also made headlines in the context of controversies based on environmental concerns over the gold mine in Ovacık village.

== Wind turbine manufacturing ==
LM Wind Power, a division of GE Renewable Energy, opened a wind turbine blade manufacturing facility in Bergama in 2017. The first blades it produced were used at the Bodangora Wind Farm in New South Wales, Australia.

== Bergama Carpets ==
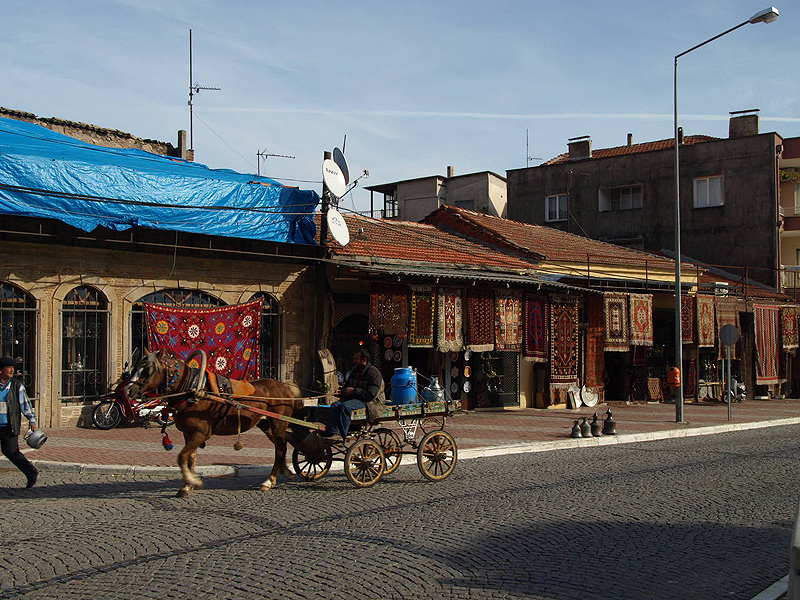
Bergama Carpets

Bergama is also renowned for its high quality carpets. There are approximately eighty villages that still weave Bergama carpets. The history of carpet weaving in Bergama dates back to the 11th century - when Turkish migration started to the area. Bergama carpets have almost always been woven with wool - an attestation to the pastoral life style of the Yörük clans populating the area at the time.

Although the history of carpet weaving in Bergama dates back to the 11th century, most surviving carpets do not age more than 200 years - mainly due to their wool content. The oldest surviving Bergama carpets can be found in mosques in and around Bergama, as well as the archaeological museum in Bergama.

== Bergama Festival ==
Between June 18–24, Bergama celebrates its annual festival "Bergama Kermesi", which is already running into its seventy-second anniversary. Bergama Kermesi is a major local event, generally celebrated with the attendance of Turkish celebrities, singers, players, poets, and writers.

== Composition ==
There are 135 neighbourhoods in Bergama District:

- Ahmetbeyler
- Akçenger
- Alacalar
- Alhatlı
- Alibeyli
- Armağanlar
- Aşağıbey
- Aşağıcuma
- Aşağıılgındere
- Aşağıkırıklar
- Atatürk
- Atçılar
- Atmaca
- Avunduk
- Avunduruk
- Ayaskent
- Ayvatlar
- Aziziye
- Bahçelievler
- Balaban
- Barbaros
- Bayramcılar
- Bekirler
- Bölcek
- Bozköy
- Bozyerler
- Çakırlar
- Çalıbahçe
- Çaltıkoru
- Çamavlu
- Çamköy
- Çamoba
- Çamtepe
- Çeltikçi
- Cevaplı
- Çitköy
- Çobanlar
- Çürükbağ
- Dağıstan
- Demircidere
- Dereköy
- Doğancı
- Durmuşlar
- Eğiller
- Eğrigöl
- Ertuğrul
- Fatih
- Ferizler
- Fevzipaşa
- Gaylan
- Gaziosmanpaşa
- Gazipaşa
- Göbeller
- Göçbeyli
- Gökçeyurt
- Gültepe
- Güneşli
- Hacıhamzalar
- Hacılar
- Halilağalar
- Hamzalısüleymaniye
- Hisarköy
- İkizler
- Ilgıncaber
- İncecikler
- İneşir
- İnkılap
- İslamsaray
- İsmailli
- Kadıköy
- Kadriye
- Kaleardı
- Kapıkaya
- Kaplanköy
- Karahıdırlı
- Karalar
- Karaveliler
- Kaşıkçı
- Katrancı
- Kıranlı
- Kırcalar
- Kızıltepe
- Kocahaliller
- Kocaköy
- Koyuneli
- Kozluca
- Kurfallı
- Kurtuluş
- Maltepe
- Maruflar
- Muratlar
- Narlıca
- Okçular
- Öksüzler
- Örenli
- Örlemiş
- Oruçlar
- Ovacık
- Paşaköy
- Pınarköy
- Pirveliler
- Rahmanlar
- Sağancı
- Sarıcalar
- Sarıcaoğlu
- Sarıdere
- Seklik
- Selçuk
- Sindel
- Süleymanlı
- Talatpaşa
- Tavukçukuru
- Teğelti
- Tekkedere
- Tepeköy
- Terzihaliller
- Tırmanlar
- Topallar
- Turabey
- Üçtepe
- Ulucami
- Ürkütler
- Yalnızdam
- Yalnızev
- Yenikent
- Yeniler
- Yerlitahtacı
- Yortanlı
- Yukarıada
- Yukarıbey
- Yukarıcuma
- Yukarıkırıklar
- Zafer
- Zağnos
- Zeytindağ

== Notable people ==
- Sabiha Gökçül Erbay (1900–1998), Turkish teacher and politician
- Alexander Savvas (1907–1981), Greek physician and academic
- Victor Laredo (1910–2003), Jewish American documentary photographer and author
- Birgül Ayman Güler (b. 1961), Turkish academic and politician
- Hüsnü Şenlendirici (b. 1976), Romani-Turkish musician

== International relations ==
Bergama is twinned with:

- Alkmaar, Netherlands
- Asenovgrad, Bulgaria
- Baalbek, Lebanon
- Böblingen, Germany
- Lefka, Cyprus
- Nea Peramos, Greece
- Orhei, Moldova
- Pergamos, Cyprus
- Piatra Neamț, Romania
- Rosoman, North Macedonia
- Sanski Most, Bosnia and Herzegovina
- Yehud, Israel

== See also ==
- Bergama carpet
- Allianoi
