= Yakhshi Khan =

Bey of Karasi from c. 1332 to 1341

- Amir al-'Azam; Sultan al-'Azam
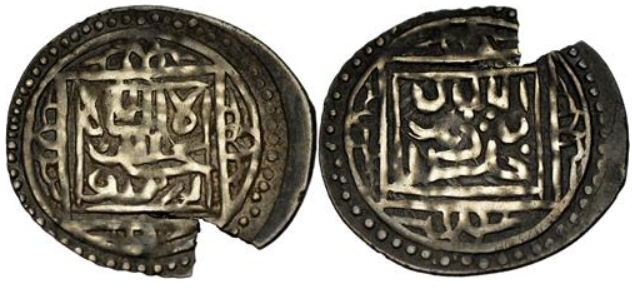
- Undated coin minted by Yakhshi Khan.

Bey of Karasi
- Reign: c. 1328 – 1332
- Predecessor: Karasi Bey; Demir Khan
- Successor: Beylerbey Chelebi
- Died: Before 1345
- Issue: Beylerbey Chelebi; Yakub; Ajlan (?)
- Father: Karasi Bey
- Religion: Islam

Shuja al-Din Yakhshi Khan was Bey of Karasi from c. 1332 to 1341.

Claude Cahen suggested Yakhshi Khan was the same person as Dursun attested to by Ottoman sources.

== Bibliography ==
- Bosworth, Clifford Edmund (1996). New Islamic Dynasties: A Chronological and Genealogical Manual. Edinburgh University Press. ISBN 9780231107143. OCLC 35029627.
- Cahen, Claude & de Planhol, Xavier (1978). "Ḳarasi̊". In van Donzel, E.; Lewis, B.; Pellat, Ch. & Bosworth, C. E. (eds.). The Encyclopaedia of Islam, Second Edition. Volume IV: Iran–Kha. Leiden: E. J. Brill. ISBN 978-90-04-05745-6. OCLC 758278456.
- Foss, Clive (2022). The Beginnings of the Ottoman Empire. Oxford Studies in Byzantium. Oxford University Press. ISBN 9780198865438.
- Günal, Zerrin (2001). "Karesioğulları". TDV Encyclopedia of Islam, Vol. 24 (Kāânî-i Şîrâzî – Kastamonu) (in Turkish). Istanbul: Presidency of Religious Affairs, Centre for Islamic Studies. pp. 488–489. ISBN 978-975-389-451-7.
- Uzunçarşılı, İsmail Hakkı (1969). Anadolu Beylikleri Ve Akkoyunlu, Karakoyunlu Devletleri [Anatolian Beyliks and Aq Qoyunlu, Qara Qoyunlu States] (in Turkish). Turkish Historical Society Press. ISBN 9751624576. OCLC 563553149.
- Zachariadou, Elizabeth (11–13 January 1991). "The Emirate of Karasi and That of the Ottomans: Two Rival States". The Ottoman Emirate (1300–1389). Halcyon Days in Crete I. Rethymnon: Foundation for Research & Technology – Hellas, Institute for Mediterranean Studies. pp. 226–236.
