= Germa (Mysia) =

Town of ancient Mysia

Coordinates: 39°22′07″N 27°41′26″E

Germa or Germe (Ancient Greek: Γέρμη) or Germae or Germai (Γέρμαι), or Hiera Germa or Hiera Germe (Ἱερά Γέρμη), meaning 'holy Germa', also known as Germa in Hellesponto to distinguish it from several other towns named Germa, was a town of ancient Mysia, situated between the rivers Macestus and Rhyndacus. It appears in episcopal notices as an archbishopric. and was represented at the Council of Ephesus and Calcedon by the bishop of the town. No longer the seat of a residential archbishop, it remains a titular see of the Roman Catholic Church.

Its site is located near Karaçam in Savaştepe, Asiatic Turkey.
