= A. Cecil Edwards =

British business executive (1881 - 1957)

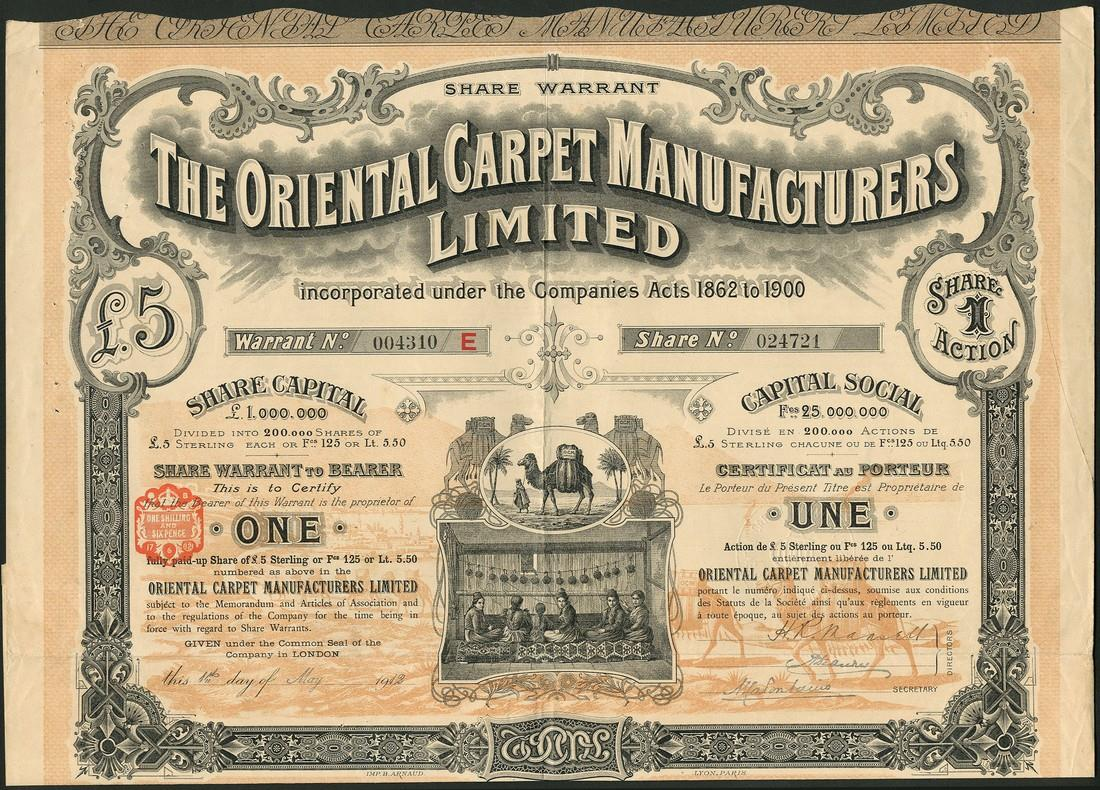
Stock certificate of Oriental Carpet Manufacturers Limited, 1912.

Arthur Cecil Edwards (1881 – 1953 or 1957) was a dealer in and authority on Persian carpets. He was managing director of the Oriental Carpet Manufacturers based in Turkey.

== Early life and family ==
Arthur Edwards was born in Constantinople in 1881 to Charles Reed Edwards (born London) and Louise Baker (born Constantinople). In 1909, Edwards married the American Clara Cary Case in Paris Hill, United States. Their son Arthur was born in 1918 in Hamadan, Iran.

== Career ==
Edwards's uncle, James Baker, was one of the founders of the Oriental Carpet Manufacturers (OCM) in Smyrna, today's Izmir, in 1907/1908. The company bought and produced Persian carpets for export to the United Kingdom.

As an OCM employee, Edwards moved to Hamadan, north-western, in 1911, where he built and managed his own carpet production for the company. He and his wife were fascinated by Persian culture. In 1923, they left Iran, traveled to Pakistan for a few months, and finally went to London. There Edwards took over the management of the OCM and expanded its business activities in the United States. He also oversaw the outsourcing of carpet production to India in order to reduce production costs. During the Second World War the family moved to Oxford and then returned to London.

His masterwork was The Persian Carpet (1953), published posthumously and repeatedly reissued. The monograph is still one of the standard works on the Persian carpet. It describes in detail the production, colors, patterns and the stylistic development of the Persian knotted carpet in the different provinces of Iran, as well as the history of the regions, their carpet production, number of looms and production figures since the end of the 19th to the middle of the 20th century, and gives an outlook on the future of the carpet industry under the influence of the European market. It was positively reviewed in The Burlington Magazine who praised it for its up to date and detailed treatment of the weavers then working in Persia.

== Death and legacy ==
The drafts of chapters for The Persian Carpet are held by the Victorian and Albert Museum in London. In August 2017 the book was still described in The Times as "an invaluable aid to carpet dealers".

== Selected publications ==
- A Persian caravan. Duckworth, London 1928. (A collection of individual stories with exotic characters, inspired by Edwards' encounters in Persia.)
- The Persian carpet: A survey of the carpet-weaving industry of Persia. Duckworth, London, 1953.
