= Eleftherios Economou =

Eleftherios N. Economou
- Ελευθέριος Ν. Οικονόμου
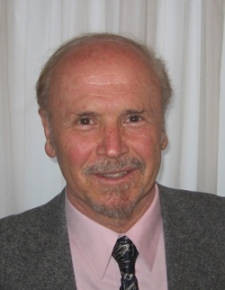
- Economou in 2006
- Born: 7 February 1940 (age 86); Athens, Greece
- Known for: Electron localization; Phononic crystal; Photonic crystal; Metamaterials; Light localization; Amorphous semiconductors
- Awards: Fellow of the APS (1994); Descartes Prize (2005); Award of the Foundation of the Greek Parliament (2010); Commander of the Order of the Phoenix (2013)
- Scientific career
- Fields: Physics, Condensed Matter Physics
- Institutions: National Technical University of Athens; University of Chicago; University of Virginia; University of Athens; University of Crete; Ames Laboratory; IESL - Forth Research Center
- Doctoral advisor: Morrel H. Cohen

Eleftherios Ν. Economou (Greek: Ελευθέριος Ν. Οικονόμου, romanized: Elefthérios N. Oikonómou; born 7 February 1940) is a Greek theoretical physicist and professor emeritus at the department of physics of the University of Crete. He has contributed to various areas of theoretical condensed matter physics, starting with the study of surface plasmons during his thesis in 1969.

Economou influenced the evolution of theoretical physics in Greece since the late 1970s, as described in detail in a special volume published in 2000, in Physica B, on the occasion on his 60th birthday. His opinion perspective is still solicited by major science journals, such as Nature Materials, in particular on how to address challenges related to effects of economic crisis in Greece in science and technology. He contributed substantially to shaping the first steps of the University of Crete and led the effort in creating the Foundation for Research & Technology – Hellas (FORTH), serving as its first director general from its foundation in 1983 until 2004. He has been teaching in the department of physics of the University of Crete since 1982 and also wrote 13 textbooks, mostly in topics related to theoretical physics and condensed matter physics. He has published over 300 refereed papers, which have received more than 29,000 citations according to Google Scholar.

== Early years ==
Eleftherios Economou was born in Athens, Greece on February 7, 1940. He grew up in a working-class neighbourhood of Kallithea and his early years, along with his parents Nikos and Sophia and his younger brother Vassilis, were influenced by World War II and in particular by the Greek Civil War that followed. In 1952 he was admitted to the selective public Experimental School of the University of Athens, from where he graduated in 1958. The same year he was admitted in the School of Electrical & Mechanical Engineering of the National Technical University of Athens. Among his classmates was John Iliopoulos, A theoretical physicist. He graduated with first class honours in 1963 and commenced the compulsory, in Greece, military service, which at the time lasted two and a half years. During this period, he was given the opportunity to attend a number of graduate level physics courses at the "Center for Advanced Studies and Philosophy of Science" which was organised at the National Centre of Scientific Research "Demokritos".

In 1965 Economou applied for graduate studies in the U.S. and was admitted to the department of physics of the University of Chicago. Before leaving for the U.S., in February 1966, he married Athanasia Paganou and they have a daughter, Sophia Economou, who is professor of physics at Virginia Polytechnic Institute and State University. He arrived in Chicago in 1966. Two months later he passed the qualifying exams, ranking first among his classmates, which made it easy to be accepted as a PhD student in the group of Morrel H. Cohen. Economou decided to focus on theoretical condensed matter physics. He completed his studies and was awarded a PhD in three years with a dissertation entitled, "Surface Plasmons in Thin Films" in 1969.

== Scientific career ==
Economou became assistant professor and later professor in the department of physics at the University of Virginia (1970–1981). He has been visiting professor at the University of Chicago (1994), Université de Lausanne (1992), Princeton University (1978), Iowa State University (1991–1992) and an affiliated member of Ames Laboratory since 1992. He was visiting researcher at the National Centre of Scientific Research "Demokritos" (1997–1998) and a Chair Professor of Theoretical Physics at the University of Athens (1978–1981). In 1981 he and P. Lambropoulos were the first elected professors in the newly founded department of physics of the University of Crete (Greece). As the acting chairman of the department he established the bases in the Physics curriculum and he was instrumental in hiring high quality faculty at the University of Crete. He was and remains a strong advocate on topics related to the negative influence of political parties and direct involvement of students in the normal operation of the universities. He retired in 2007, and still serves and teaches in the department of physics as professor emeritus.

Economou was the prominent figure of a group of five Greek scientists from abroad, namely Fotis Kafatos, Dionysios (Dennis) Tsichritzis, Grigoris Sifakis and Peter (Panagiotis) Lambropoulos, who planned the idea and with the help of the Minister of Research and Technology Georgios Lianis, convinced the Greek Government to create the first three Institutes of the Research Center of Crete (RCC; Ερευνητικό Κέντρο Κρήτης – ΕΚΕΚ) in Heraklion. During his leadership as its first director general (1983–2004), RCC expanded with the Institute of Mediterranean Studies (IMS) in Rethymno and the Institute of Applied Computational Mathematics in Heraklion. In 1986 Skinakas Observatory, jointly supported by RCC, the University of Crete and the Max Planck Institute for Extraterrestrial Physics (Germany) also commenced its operations. In 1987 with the agreement of George Papatheodorou and Iacovos Vasalos Directors of the Institute of Chemical Engineering & High Temperature Processes - (ICE/HT) in Patras, and the Chemical Process Engineering Research Institute (CPERI) Thessaloniki, the two Institutes joined RCC and the Foundation for Research & Technology – Hellas (FORTH) was created. In 2000 CPERI was renamed Centre for Research and Technology Hellas (CERTH) becoming independent of FORTH. In 2002 the Biomedical Research Institute (BRI), based in Ioannina was incorporated into FORTH. In parallel, with financial support from the European Union, the construction of the FORTH buildings in Heraklion, Patras, Thessaloniki, and the restoration of the IMS building in Rethymno began. Science and Technology Parks were established connected to the institutes in Heraklion, Patras, and Thessaloniki and respective buildings with European funding were erected. The main FORTH building infrastructure in Heraklion in 2004 had an area of 30,000 square meters. Most of the buildings were designed and supervised by Panos Koulermos, then a professor of architecture at the University of Southern California. FORTH has been established as the premier research organisation in Greece, ranking consistently first in scientific quality and international recognition by a variety of metrics, including evaluations by external Committees as well as attracting funding by European Research Council grants. Achieving this status was not easy, as several times the supervising agencies attempted to introduce political criteria and to intervene.

Economou stepped down from the position of director general of FORTH in April 2004, and he was succeeded by Stelios C. Orphanoudakis. Three years later, in 2007, he reached the compulsory retirement age of 67 at the university. He was awarded the title of emeritus professor at the University of Crete. He continued to teach until 2024 and he still remains active in research. A symposium on his honor entitled "From electrons to elastic and electromagnetic waves" was organized on June 30, 2025 on the occasion of his 85th birthday.

== Research areas ==
Economou worked in a broad range of topics in the area of condensed matter physics. These topics include electronic properties of many different materials and systems, with emphasis on systems with defects (crystallographic defects) and disordered systems (e.g. amorphous semiconductors), magnetic and optical properties of different materials, including superconductors and strongly correlated materials, surface plasmons and their interactions in metals and semiconductors, electron-phonon interactions, non-linear systems and properties, acoustic wave and elastic wave propagation in random and periodic media (e.g. phononic crystals), and electromagnetic wave propagation in complex systems, with emphasis on photonic crystals and metamaterials.

Since 1990 Economou's research is mainly focused on electromagnetic and acoustic/elastic wave propagation in complex systems. He was one of the initiators of the field of phononic crystals (i.e. acoustic/elastic wave band gap materials) which led to the more recent and wider field of acoustic metamaterials. His 1992 publication «Elastic and acoustic wave band structure», was one of the two (almost simultaneous) publications discussing for the first time the concept of the acoustic band gap. This paper was followed by many other well-recognized of Economou's works in the field of phononic crystals and elastic wave propagation in complex systems (see).

In the field of electromagnetic metamaterials, Economou's research helped to eliminate some of the first objections of the scientific community on the possibility of the existence of Negative-index metamaterials, revealing the possibility and limitations for the achievement of negative refractive index in the optical spectrum, and demonstrating some of the unique properties and capabilities of metamaterials (e.g. the possibility for achievement of repulsive Casimir force in chiral metamaterials). In his research on metamaterials, Economou works in close collaboration with his long-term colleague Costas Soukoulis, since the period 1979 to 1982 when Soukoulis was a postdoctoral researcher under his supervision at the University of Virginia. The collaborative research on negative index metamaterials led by Economou and Soukoulis, including scientists from Imperial College (Sir John Pendry), Karlsruhe Institute of Technology and Bilkent University (Ekmel Özbay), was recognized with the award of the European Union Descartes prize for collaborative research in 2005.

One of the most important scientific contributions by Economou is considered his PhD work on surface plasmons. The relevant 1969 publication "Surface plasmons in thin films", among the first of his career, has become a reference work for the modern field of plasmonics.

Among Economou's earlier research, quite important is considered also the research on Anderson localization in systems with defects (i.e., crystallographic defect) and disordered systems. Many of the novel and important results of this research are summarized in his book "Green's Functions in Quantum Physics".

== Books ==
Economou has written several physics textbooks in Greek and in English. His book Green's functions in Quantum Physics, originally published in 1979, has received more than 2500 citations according to Google Scholar. It was included in the electronic Springer Book Archives containing 40 renowned imprints published by Springer between 1842 and 2005.

=== Books in English ===
- "Green's functions in Quantum Physics", Springer-Verlag, 1979. Second edition 1983, third edition 2006.
- "A Short Journey from Quarks to the Universe" , SpringerBriefs, 2011. A 2nd enlarged edition appeared in Jan. 2016 entitled "From Quarks to the Universe: A short Physics Course", Springer-Verlag, 2016.
- "The Physics of Solids. Essentials and Beyond", Springer-Verlag, 2010.

=== Books in Greek ===
- "Statistical Physics and Thermodynamics", Crete University Press, 1994, 2nd ed., 2001
- "Science: How its allurement set", Eurasian Publications, Athens 2012
- "From Quarks to the Universe: A short journey", Crete University Press, 2012
- "Solid State Physics Vol. I: Metals, Semiconductors, Insulators", Crete University Press, 1997
- "Solid State Physics. Vol. II: Order, Disorder, Correlations", Crete University Press, 2003
- "Solid State Physics: A shortened version", Crete University Press, 2016
- "Solids I – General View" & "Solids I – Metals and Semiconductors", Hellenic Open University, 1999
- "Nuclear Weapons and Human Civilization", Crete University Press, 1985, 2nd ed. 1987
- "Contemporary Physics", Volume 1, Crete University Press, 1989, 5th ed., 2010 (co-author)
- "Contemporary Physics", Volume 2, Crete University Press, 1989, 1991, 5th ed., 2010 (co-author)
- "This world so small so large", Crete University Press, 2025

== Awards ==
- Fellow of the American Physical Society (1994) "...For contributions to the theory of disordered systems including mobility edges and localization of classical waves."
- Honorary PhD, Grenoble Institute of Technology, France (1994)
- Honorary PhD, Department of Materials Science & Engineering, University of Ioannina, Greece (2004)
- Outstanding Referee by the American Physics Society (2008)
- Award of the Foundation of the Greek Parliament (2010)
- Commander of the Order of the Phoenix by the President of the Greek Republic (2013)
- Award of Ethical Order of the city of Heraklion (2020)
- Naming of the main building of FORTH in Heraklion to "Building Eleftherios Economou" (2023)

== Selected publications ==
- E.N. Economou, "Surface Plasmons in Thin Films", Phys. Rev. 182, 539–554 (1969)
- E.N. Economou, M.H. Cohen, "Existence of Mobility Edges in Anderson's Model for Radom Lattices", Phys. Rev. B. 5, 2931–2948 (1972)
- E.N. Economou, C.M. Soukoulis, "Static Conductance and Scaling Theory of Localization in One Dimension", Phys. Rev. Lett. 46, 618–621 (1981)
- M. Sigalas, E.N. Economou,"Elastic and Acoustic Wave Band Structure", Journal of Sound and Vibration, 158 (2), 377 (1992)
- M. Kafesaki, R. S. Penciu, and E. N. Economou "Air bubbles in water: a strongly multiple scattering medium for acoustic waves" Physical Review Letters 84 (26), 6050 (2000)
- S. Foteinopoulou, E.N. Economou, C.M. Soukoulis, "Refraction at Media with Negative Refractive Index", Phys. Rev. Lett. 90, 107402 (2003)
- J. Zhou, Th. Koschny, M. Kafesaki, E.N. Economou, J. Pendry, and C.M. Soukoulis, "Saturation of the Magnetic Response of Split-Ring Resonators at Optical Frequencies", Phys. Rev. Lett. 95 (22) 223902 (2005)
- S. Droulias, I. Katsantonis, M. Kafesaki, C.M. Soukoulis, E.N. Economou "Chiral Metamaterials with PT-Symmetry and Beyond" Physical Review Letters 122 (21), 213201 (2019)
