= Oikonomou =

Oikonomou (Greek: Οικονόμου), also transliterated as Ikonomou and Economou, is a Greek surname, deriving from the word oikonomos, "housekeeper, steward". It can refer to:

- Aikaterini Oikonomou, birth name of Ketty Diridaoua, Greek actress
- Antonis Oikonomou (1785–1821), naval captain in the Greek War of Independence
- Constantin von Economo (1876–1931), Austrian neurologist
- Demetris Economou (born 1992), Cypriot association football player
- Dimitrios Oikonomou (1883–1957), Greek admiral
- Eleftherios N. Economou (born 1940), Greek Professor of Physics, father of Sophia
- Eleftherios Oikonomou (born 1956), Greek Chief of Police
- Evangelos Ikonomou (born 1987), Greek association football player
- George Economou (poet) (1934–2019), American poet
- George Economou (Shipbuilder) (born 1953), Greek billionaire shipowner
- George A. Economou, Sr. (1923–2003), optical systems expert
- Ioannis Ikonomou. (born 1964) Greek Translator, knows 43 living languages, 47 including dead languages
- James S. Economou (born 1951), surgical oncologist, tumor immunologist, and Vice Chancellor for Research at UCLA
- Manthos Oikonomou (1754–1820), Greek scholar and Ali Pasha's advisor
- Marios Oikonomou (1992–2026), Greek footballer
- Michalis Oikonomou (1888–1933), Greek impressionist painter
- Nicolas Economou (1953–1993), Cypriot composer
- Nick Economou, Australian political scientist
- Nikos Ekonomou (born 1973), Greek basketball player
- Panajotis Iconomou (born 1971), Greek-German baritone
- Pavlos Oikonomou-Gouras (1897–1991), Greek diplomat
- Sophia Economou, American physicist, daughter of Eleftherios
- Thanasis Oikonomou (born 1978), Greek swimmer
- Thomas Oikonomou (1864–1927), Greek actor
