= Battle of Bapheus =

1302 battle of the Byzantine-Ottoman Wars

- Part of the Byzantine–Ottoman wars
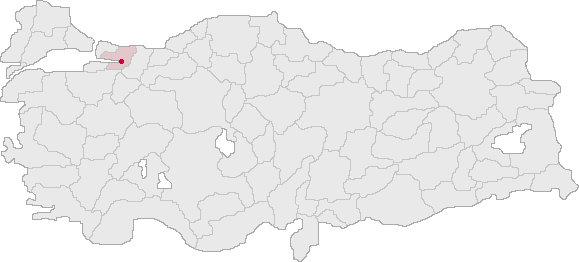
- Kocaeli Province, Turkey
Date	27 July 1299
Location	Koyunhisar plain
Result	Ottoman victory
Territorial changes	Koyunhisar and castles near Bursa annexed by the Ottomans

Belligerents
Byzantine Empire	(Ottoman Empire) Ottoman Beylik; Loyal Turkmen tribes

Commanders and leaders
(Byzantine Empire) Georgios Mouzalon	(Ottoman Empire) Osman Gazi (Ottoman Empire) Köse Mihal

Strength
~2,000	~5,000

The Battle of Bapheus occurred on 27 July 1299, between an Ottoman Turkish army under Osman I and a Byzantine army under Georgios Mouzalon. The battle ended in a crucial Ottoman victory, cementing the Ottoman state and heralding the final capture of Byzantine Bithynia by the Ottoman Turks.

== Background ==
Osman I had succeeded in the leadership of his clan in c. 1281, and over the next two decades launched a series of ever-deeper raids into the Byzantine borderlands of Bithynia. By 1301, the Ottoman Turks were besieging Nicaea, the former imperial capital of the Byzantines, and pillaging the outskirts of Prusa. The Turkish raids also threatened the port city of Nicomedia with famine, as Turkish warrior bands roamed the countryside and prohibited the collection of the harvest (see Akinji).

In the spring of 1300, the Co-Emperor Michael IX (r. 1294–1320) launched a campaign which reached south to Magnesia. The Turks, awed by his large army, avoided battle. Michael sought to confront them, but was dissuaded by his generals. The Turks, encouraged, resumed their raids, virtually isolating him at Magnesia. His army dissolved without battle, as the local troops left to defend their homes, and the Alans, too, left to rejoin their families in Thrace. Michael was forced to withdraw by the sea, followed by another wave of refugees.

== Battle ==
To counter the threat to Nicomedia, Michael's father, Andronikos II Palaiologos (r. 1282–1328), sent a Byzantine force of some 2,000 men (half of whom were recently hired Alan mercenaries), under the megas hetaireiarches, George Mouzalon, to cross over the Bosporus and relieve the city.

At the plain of Bapheus (Greek: Βαφεύς), an unidentified site (perhaps to the east of Nicomedia but within sight of the city) on 27 July 1302, the Byzantines met a Turkish army of some 5,000 light cavalry under Osman himself, composed of his own troops as well as allies from the Turkish tribes of Paphlagonia and the Maeander River area. The Turkish cavalry charged the Byzantines, whose Alan contingent did not participate in the battle. The Turks broke the Byzantine line, forcing George Mouzalon to withdraw into Nicomedia under the cover of the Alan force.

== Aftermath ==
Bapheus was the first major victory for the nascent Ottoman Beylik, and of major significance for its future expansion: the Byzantines effectively lost control of the countryside of Bithynia, withdrawing to their forts, which, isolated, fell one by one. After this battle the countryside of Bithynia was left practically defenceless so Osman used this opportunity to conquer the castle of Koyunhisar and the coastal town of Gemlik. The Byzantine defeat also sparked an exodus of the Christian population from the area into the European parts of the empire, further altering the region's demographic balance. Coupled with the defeat at Magnesia, which allowed the Turks to reach and establish themselves on the coasts of the Aegean Sea, Bapheus thus heralded the final loss of Asia Minor for Byzantium. According to Halil İnalcık, the battle allowed the Ottomans to achieve the characteristics and qualities of a state. The Ottoman conquest of Bithynia was nonetheless gradual, and the last Byzantine outpost there, Nicomedia, fell only in 1337.

After the victory, thousands of Turkish gazi warriors, who believed that the resistance of the Byzantine Empire had been broken, came in hordes from the hinterland of Anatolia to Bithynia to raid for spoils. Byzantine historian George Pachymeres indicated that the news had reached the Muslim raiders in Paphlagonia and that the fame of Osman Gazi had reached there. He writes that "now the threats came up to the gates of Constantinople and the Turks were wandering around freely in small groups on the other side of the Straits". There is not a single day that passes without hearing that the enemy is attacking the fortresses on the coast and taking people prisoners or killing them".

== Date of the Battle Contested, 1299 vs 1302 ==
The dating of the Battle of Bapheus, often regarded as the event marking the emergence of the Ottoman state, remains a point of historical debate. Early historians such as Edward Gibbon, following the seventheenth-century scholar Peter Poussines, placed the battle on July 27th, 1299 after reconstructing the chronology of the Byzantine historian George Pachymeres. This was also affirmed by the Turkish historian Mustafa who affirmed the 1299 date as the arab year 699 (1299).

In the 19th century, however, Joseph von Hammer-Purgstall challenged this chronology, first proposing 1301 and later 1302. His reconstruction was accepted by many scholars.

However, in a more recent 2017 study, this understanding was challenged and additional evidence was presented affirming the 1299 date better fits Pachymeres narrative. A position was put forward that contended that modern historians have misunderstood Pachymeres' literary method, which frequently arranges events through anticipation and retrospection rather than strict chronological sequence. According to the 2017 analysis, Pachymeres' account aligns consistently with the exceptionally severe winter of 1298-1299. The emperor's departure for Thessalonica in February 1299, the catastrophic spring flooding of the Sangarius River, and the subsequent Battle of Bapheus on July 27th 1299.

Additionally it was shown that the 1302 chronology conflicts with independent evidence describing a prolonged drought across the Black Sea region between 1300 and 1303, making the severe winter, flooding, and storm conditions by Pachymeres difficult to reconcile with that year.

While many historians continue to follow von Hammer's 1302 dating, the more recent 2017 reassessment revives the earlier Gibbon chronology, arguing that a careful reading of Pachymeres and corroborating contemporary sources provides stronger support for the July 27th 1299 as the date of the Battle of Bapheus.

== Sources ==
- Bartusis, Mark C. (1997), The Late Byzantine Army: Arms and Society 1204–1453, University of Pennsylvania Press, ISBN 978-0-8122-1620-2
- İnalcık, Halil (1994), "Osman Ghazi's Siege of Nicaea and the Battle of Bapheus", in Zachariadou, Elizabeth (ed.), The Ottoman Emirate (1300–1389). Halcyon Days in Crete I: A Symposium Held in Rethymnon, 11–13 January 1991 (PDF), Crete University Press, ISBN 960-7309-58-8, archived from the original (PDF) on 22 June 2010
- Kazhdan, Alexander, ed. (1991). The Oxford Dictionary of Byzantium. Oxford and New York: Oxford University Press. ISBN 0-19-504652-8.
- Laiou, Angeliki E. (1972), Constantinople and the Latins: The Foreign Policy of Andronicus II, 1282–1328, Harvard University Press, ISBN 978-0-674-16535-9
- Nicol, Donald M. (1993) [1972]. The Last Centuries of Byzantium, 1261–1453 (Second ed.). Cambridge: Cambridge University Press. ISBN 978-0-521-43991-6.
