= Konstantinos Drosatos =

Greek American molecular biologist

- Born: Athens, Greece
- Citizenship: Greek & USA
- Education: Aristotle University of Thessaloniki (2000); University of Crete (2002); Boston University (2007)
- Alma mater: Aristotle University of Thessaloniki (2000); University of Crete (2002)
- Scientific career
- Institutions: Columbia University; Temple University; University of Cincinnati College of Medicine
- Thesis: Gene regulation and functions of Apolipoprotein E (2007)
- Website: www.drosatos.com

Konstantinos Drosatos (Greek: Κωνσταντίνος Δροσάτος), born in Athens, Greece, is a Greek-American molecular biologist, who is the Ohio Eminent Scholar and Professor of Pharmacology, Physiology, and Neurobiology at the University of Cincinnati College of Medicine in Cincinnati, Ohio, U.S. His parents are Georgios Drosatos and Sofia Drosatou; he was born in Athens, Greece and his family originates in Partheni, Euboea, Greece.

== Education and career ==
Drosatos received his B.Sc. from the department of biology at the Aristotle University of Thessaloniki, Greece in 2000. In 2000, he continued with graduate studies at the Molecular Biology-Biomedicine graduate program of the department of biology and the medical school of the University of Crete. He received his M.Sc. in 2002 and his Ph.D. in molecular biology-biomedicine in 2007. During his graduate studies (2002–2007) he was a visiting research scholar in the laboratory of Vassilis I. Zannis at Boston University Medical School. Following his graduation with a PhD in molecular biology-biomedicine in 2007, he joined the laboratory of Ira J. Goldberg at Columbia University, where he pursued post-doctoral training until 2012, when he was promoted to associate research scientist in the department of medicine at Columbia University. In 2014 he joined the faculty of the Lewis Katz School of Medicine at Temple University as an assistant professor in pharmacology and in 2020, he was promoted to associate professor with tenure in cardiovascular sciences (primary affiliation). In 2022, he was recruited at the University of Cincinnati College of Medicine, which he joined as the Ohio Eminent Scholar and Professor of Pharmacology and Systems Physiology

== Research interests ==
The research in his laboratory focuses on cardiovascular and systemic metabolism and particularly on signaling mechanisms that link cardiac stress in diabetes, sepsis and ischemia with altered myocardial fatty acid metabolism. His published work focuses on the transcriptional regulation of proteins that underlie lipoprotein metabolism, cardiac and systemic fatty acid metabolism, and mitochondrial function. His work has identified the role of Krüppel-like factor 5 (KLF5) in the regulation of cardiac fatty acid metabolism in diabetes, ischemic heart failure, ischemia/reperfusion-related myocardial injury as well as how cardiac lipotoxicity leads to cardiac dysfunction, and the importance of cardiac fatty acid oxidation and mitochondrial integrity for the treatment of cardiac dysfunction in sepsis.. His research group has also discovered toxic roles sourcing from persistent signaling of the hormone FGF21 in diet-induced obesity and cardiac hypertrophy.

== Distinctions and awards ==
- 2014 Outstanding Early Career Award recipient, American Heart Association, BCVS Council
- 2016 Honorary Citizen, Eastern Mani Municipality, Greece
- 2016 Visiting Professorship, UCLA Center for Systems Biomedicine
- 2017 Early Research Investigator Award, Lewis Katz School of Medicine at Temple University
- 2017 Elected Fellow (FAHA), American Heart Association
- 2019 Elected Full Member, Sigma Xi, The Scientific Research Honor Society
- 2022 Visiting Professorship, School of Medicine, Aristotle University of Thessaloniki, Greece
- 2023 Honorary Membership at the Biology Society of Cyprus
- 2023 Adjunct Professorship, European University of Cyprus
- 2023 Keynote Speaker, Trinity Translational Medicine Institute, Trinity College Dublin, Ireland
- 2023 Keynote Speaker, Vascular and Heart Research Symposium, The Fralin Biomedical Research Institute, Virginia Tech at Roanoke
- 2024 Elected Fellow of the Graduate College of the University of Cincinnati

== Distinctions and awards of Drosatos Lab trainees ==
- 2018 Ioannis D. Kyriazis - American Heart Association Postdoctoral Fellowship (2 years)
- 2018 Matthew Hoffman - American Heart Association Predoctoral Fellowship (2 years)
- 2019 Matthew Hoffman - NHLBI-NIH F30 Predoctoral Fellowship (2 years)
- 2020 Ioannis D. Kyriazis - Finalist for the "Melvin L. Marcus Early Career Investigator Award in Cardiovascular Sciences", American Heart Association Scientific Sessions
- 2024 Sobuj Mia – American Heart Association Career Development Award (3 years)
- 2024 Sobuj Mia – Winner of the Young Investigator Competition Award (YICA) – North American Section-International Society for Heart Research, The XLIII North American Society Annual Meeting, Long Beach, CA
- 2025 Georgios Siokatas - American Heart Association Predoctoral Fellowship (2 years)
- 2026 Kajol Thapa – 2026 Sigma Xi Chapter GIAR award

== Leadership positions ==
- 2006–2010 – Founding President of the board of directors, Hellenic Bioscientific Association of the USA
- 2012–2014 – President of the executive board, World Hellenic Biomedical Association
- 2017 - Director, "Stavros Niarchos Foundation" Research Training Program in Clinical & Experimental Medicine, World Hellenic Biomedical Association
- 2019–2023 – Vice-President of the executive council, ARISTEiA-Institute for the Advancement of Research & Education in Arts, Sciences & Technology
- 2020-2021 - Chair-elect of the Mid-career Committee, International Society for Heart Research-North American Section
- 2023-2026 - General Secretary of the Executive Board, KOMVOS-NODE
- 2025-2027 - Chair-elect and Chair, Cardiometabolic Disorders Committee, American Heart Association
- 2024-2028 - President of the executive council, ARISTEiA-Institute for the Advancement of Research & Education in Arts, Sciences & Technology
