= Panos Deloukas =

Panagiotis "Panos" Deloukas is a Professor of Cardiovascular Genomics and Dean for Life Sciences at the William Harvey Research Institute. This institute is a division of Queen Mary University of London (QMUL)'s Barts and the London School of Medicine and Dentistry. He has been an ISI highly cited researcher since 2012 and was elected a fellow of the Academy of Medical Sciences in 2018.

== Education and career ==
Deloukas received his bachelor's degree in chemistry from the Aristotelian University of Thessaloniki in Greece and his master's degree in microbiology from Paris Diderot University in France. In 1991, he earned his Ph.D. from the Biozentrum University of Basel in Switzerland. He began working at the Sanger Centre in the United Kingdom in 1994, and continued to work there until 2013, when he began working at the William Harvey Research Institute at QMUL. At the Sanger Centre, he worked on the analysis of chromosomes 10 and 20 for the Human Genome Project, followed by a role designing SNP maps of the human genome for the HapMap Project.

As of November 2024, Prof. Panagiotis Deloukas is the Director of the Greek Institute of Human Genomics of the Foundation for Research and Technology-Hellas, following his election by a seven-member Evaluation Committee.
