= Nektarios Tavernarakis =

Greek geneticist and molecular biologist

- Νεκτάριος Νικολάου Ταβερναράκης
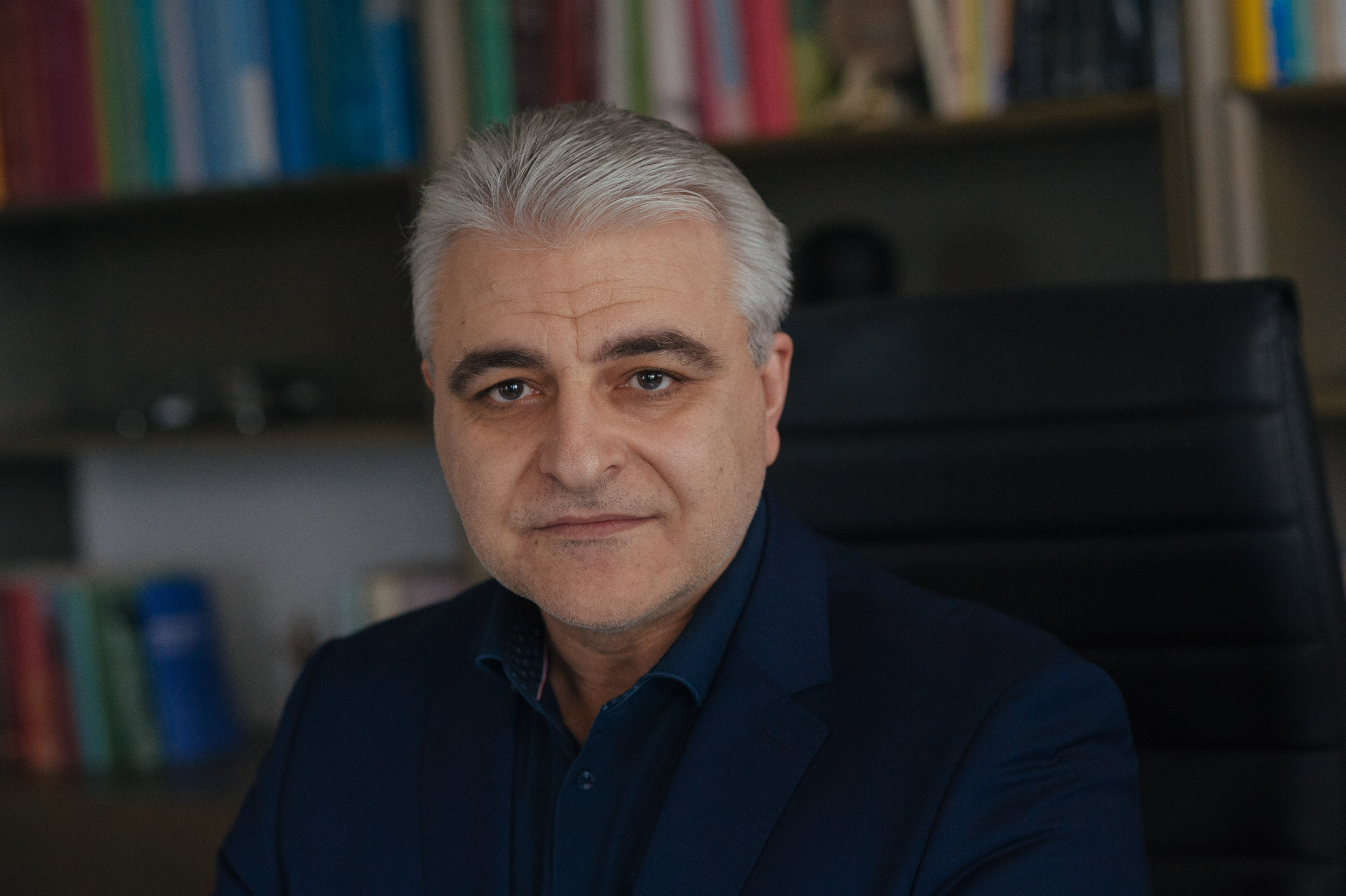
- Nektarios Tavernarakis at the Foundation for Research & Technology in Heraklion Crete, Greece (ca. 2020)
- Born: May 2, 1967 (age 59); Heraklion, Crete, Greece
- Citizenship: Greek
- Education: BSc: Biology, Aristotle University of Thessaloniki (1989); PhD: Molecular Genetics, University of Crete (1995)
- Known for: Ageing, Necrosis, Neurodegeneration
- Awards: Doctor Honoris Causa, University of Cyprus, Department Biological Sciences (2026); Datta Medal and Lecture, Federation of European Biochemical Societies (FEBS, 2026); Doctor Honoris Causa, Ionian University, Department of Informatics (2025); European Research Council (ERC) Advanced Investigator grant award (twice, in 2008 and 2016); European Research Council (ERC) Proof of Concept grant award (2016); EMBO Young Investigator award (2002); Academy of Athens BioMedical Research Award (2014); Alexander von Humboldt Friedrich Wilhelm Bessel research award (2007); Galien Scientific Research Award (2017); Helmholtz International Fellow Award (2017); Human Frontier Science Program (HFSP) long-term postdoctoral fellowship (1996); Bodossaki Foundation Excellence Award (2024); Bodossaki Foundation Scientific Prize for Medicine and Biology (2005); Foundation for Research and Technology Research Excellence award (2007); Empeirikeion Foundation Academic Excellence Prize (2012)
- Scientific career
- Fields: Biology, Cell Biology, Ageing, Neurodegeneration, Systems Biology, Metabolism
- Workplaces: Foundation for Research & Technology – Hellas (FORTH), Institute of Molecular Biology and Biotechnology (IMBB); University of Crete, Medical School
- Thesis: The yeast transcriptional activator Gcn4p: Expression and function (1995)
- Website: www.elegans.gr

Notes
- Member of the Academy of Athens, the German National Academy of Sciences-Leopoldina, the European Academy of Sciences, the EMBO, Academia Europaea, & the European Academy of Sciences and Arts. Fellow of the AAAS. Fellow of the Royal Society of Biology. Chairman of the EIT Governing Board. Vice President of the ERC Scientific Council.

Nektarios N. Tavernarakis (Greek: Νεκτάριος Ν. Ταβερναράκης) is a Greek bioscientist, who studies Ageing, Cell death, and Neurodegeneration. He is currently Distinguished Professor of Molecular Systems Biology at the Medical School of the University of Crete, in Heraklion, Crete, Greece, and President of the European Molecular Biology Conference (EMBC). He is also Distinguished Member of the Foundation for Research and Technology, and the founder and first Director of the Graduate Program in Bioinformatics of the University of Crete Medical School. He has served as Chairman of the board of Directors at the Foundation for Research and Technology, and Director of the Institute of Molecular Biology and Biotechnology, where he is heading the Neurogenetics and Ageing laboratory. He was elected Vice President of the European Research Council (ERC) in 2020, and Chairman of the European Institute of Innovation and Technology (EIT) governing board and executive committee in 2022.

== Early years ==
Nektarios Tavernarakis was born and grew up in Megali Vrisi, a small village in the municipality of Gortyna, about 30 Km to the south of Heraklion, and graduated with honours from the 1st High School of Heraklion (Kapetanakeio).

== Biographical information ==
Nektarios Tavernarakis completed his undergraduate studies at the Department of Biology of the Aristotle University, in Thessaloniki, Greece (graduated with honours in 1989), and obtained his PhD degree from the Department of Biology of the University of Crete, in Heraklion, Greece, having received the best PhD Thesis Award. He trained as a postdoctoral researcher at the Department of Molecular Biology & Biochemistry of Rutgers University in New Jersey, USA. He has made notable contributions relevant to cell death, neurodegeneration and ageing, documented in the scientific literature.

In 2020, Nektarios Tavernarakis was elected vice president of the European Research Council (ERC), and in 2022, he became chairman of the European Institute of Innovation and Technology (EIT) Governing Board, He is a member of the European Molecular Biology Organization (EMBO), the European Academy of Sciences (EurASc), Academia Europaea, the German National Academy of Sciences-Leopoldina and the European Academy of Sciences and Arts (EASA). He is also a corresponding member of the Academy of Athens, and a Fellow of the American Association for the Advancement of Science (AAAS).

His work has received several prominent awards and scientific prizes, including two European Research Council (ERC) Advanced Investigator grant awards (in 2008 and 2016), a European Research Council (ERC) Proof of Concept grant award, the EMBO Young Investigator award, the International Human Frontier Science Program (HFSP) long-term postdoctoral fellowship, the BioMedical Research Award of the Academy of Athens, the Valergakis Post-Graduate Award of the Hellenic University Club of New York, the Galien Scientific Research Award, the Helmholtz International Fellow Award, the Alexander von Humboldt Foundation, Friedrich Wilhelm Bessel research award, the Research Excellence award of the Foundation for Research and Technology, and the Empeirikeion Foundation Academic Excellence Prize, among others. He is also the recipient of the Excellence Award, and the Scientific Prize for Medicine and Biology, of the Bodossaki Foundation, which are two of the most competitive scientific distinctions for Greeks, in Greece and abroad. He is the only Greek scientist to have been awarded both these prestigious prizes.

== Research and scientific achievements ==
Nektarios Tavernarakis has contributed to the elucidation of the molecular mechanisms of necrotic cell death and neurodegeneration, the interplay between cellular metabolism and ageing, the mechanisms of sensory transduction and integration by the nervous system. He has also contributed towards the development of novel genetic tools for biomedical research, including an RNA interference (RNAi) method that allows efficient knockdown of neuronal genes. His PhD Thesis research focused on the expression and function of key stress response transcriptional activators in the yeast Saccharomyces cerevisiae, and provided original insights on the regulation of these activators by nutrient limitation, and the role of DNA in determining interactions between transcription factors and co-factors. His laboratory at IMBB was the first to commence Caenorhabditis elegans research in Greece. He has published more than 285 papers in peer-reviewed scientific journals, such as Nature. His work has received more than 67,000 citations, with an h-index of 91. Among the notable discoveries of his team are the sophisticated molecular mechanisms, by which diverse physiological signals are integrated to modulate cellular mitochondrial content, protein synthesis, and energy homeostasis during ageing. These studies revealed intricate signaling pathways that coordinate mitophagy and mitochondrial biogenesis, to determine the number of mitochondria in cells, under stress and during ageing. Work from his lab implicated autophagy, lysosomal function, endocytosis, intracellular calcium homeostasis and specific proteolytic enzymes as major contributors to necrosis and neurodegeneration. His group developed, for the first time, experimental heat stroke models; and identified mechanisms protecting against heat cytotoxicity and other necrotic insults. He has isolated and characterized specific ion channels, involved in proprioception and coordinated locomotion, in dopaminergic signalling and associative learning. His team was the first to delineate the role of autophagy in the regulation of synaptic plasticity and behaviour under nutrient deprivation and stress. Work in his laboratory also led to the identification of specific nuclear autophagy mediators and the characterization of their role in ageing and germline immortality.

== Science advocacy ==
Nektarios Tavernarakis has been active in science policy, research governance and public advocacy for basic research. His public engagement has focused on research funding, scientific governance, international collaboration, and the role of science in economic development and evidence-informed policymaking. He has argued that curiosity-driven, frontier research is the foundation of technological innovation and long-term economic competitiveness.

In a widely publicized, opinion article published in the scientific journal EMBO Reports, he argued that major technological advances arise from decades of investment in fundamental science and cautioned against research policies that prioritize short-term applications at the expense of basic research. He has also commented extensively on the development of the Greek research ecosystem. In interviews with the European Molecular Biology Organization (EMBO), he argued that strengthening research infrastructure, reducing administrative burdens, providing predictable long-term funding and attracting international scientific talent are essential for improving Greece's competitiveness in research and innovation.

Tavernarakis has consistently promoted interdisciplinary research in the life sciences. In interviews published by The FEBS Journal and the FEBS Network, he encouraged molecular and cell biologists to engage with research beyond their immediate specialization, arguing that many important advances emerge at the interface of biology with computational science, engineering and artificial intelligence.

In interviews with the national Greek newspaper To Vima, Tavernarakis has argued that scientific research constitutes an important component of national resilience, technological sovereignty and economic prosperity. He has advocated sustained public investment in research and innovation and emphasized that scientific excellence should be treated as a long-term national strategic priority.

== Personal life ==
Nektarios Tavernarakis is married and the father of two daughters. He is a licensed radio amateur, active mainly in the VHF, UHF and SHF radio bands. His callsign is SV9IOR.

== Selected awards and distinctions ==
- Doctor Honoris Causa, University of Cyprus, Department Biological Sciences
- Datta Medal of the Federation of European Biochemical Societies (FEBS)
- Doctor Honoris Causa, Ionian University, Department of Informatics
- President of the European Molecular Biology Conference (EMBC) (2025)
- Bodossaki Foundation, Excellence Award (2024)
- Member of the European Academy of Sciences (EurASc), (2023)
- Fellow of the Royal Society of Biology (FRSB), London, UK (2023)
- Chairman of the European Institute of Innovation and Technology (EIT) Governing Board and Executive Committee (2022)
- Fellow of the American Association for the Advancement of Science (AAAS) (2020)
- Elected Vice President, Scientific Council of the European Research Council (ERC) (2020)
- Member of the European Institute of Innovation and Technology (EIT) Governing Board and Executive Committee (2020)
- Member of the German National Academy of Sciences-Leopoldina (2019)
- Corresponding Member of the Academy of Athens (2019)
- Member of the European Academy of Sciences and Arts (2018)
- Helmholtz International Fellow Award (2017)
- Galien Scientific Research Award (2017)
- Honorary Education Business Award (2017)
- Member of the Scientific Council of the European Research Council (ERC) (2016)
- European Research Council (ERC), Advanced Investigator Grant award (2016)
- Research Support Award, Fondation Santé (2015)
- BioMedical Research Excellence Award, Academy of Athens, (2014)
- Member of Academia Europaea (2014)
- Empeirikeion Foundation, Academic Excellence Prize (2012)
- Excellence Professor, Medical School, University of Crete (2010)
- Member of the European Molecular Biology Organization (EMBO) (2009)
- European Research Council (ERC), Advanced Investigator Grant award (2008)
- Foundation for Research and Technology, Research Excellence award (2007)
- Alexander von Humboldt, Friedrich Wilhelm Bessel Research award (2007)
- Member of the Faculty of 1000 in Biology/Medicine, section on Cellular Death & Stress Responses (2006)
- Bodossaki Foundation, Academic Prize in Medicine and Biology (2005)
- European Molecular Biology Organization (EMBO) Young Investigator (2002–2005)
- International Human Frontier Science Program Organization (HFSPO) fellow (1996–2000)
- State of New Jersey, Commission on Cancer Research fellow (1996)
- Hellenic University Club of New York, Frederick Valergakis, Academic achievement award (1996)

== Selected publications ==
- Sotiriou A, Konstantinidis G, Tavernarakis N (2026-06-04). "CYLD-mediated lysine63 deubiquitination regulates synaptic transmission and autophagy to mitigate age-related sequelae". Nature Communications. doi:10.1038/s41467-026-73966-5. PMID 42243117.
- Tavernarakis N (2026-06-02). "The nuclear shredder behind PARPi resistance". Nature Cell Biology. 28 (6): 1095–1097. doi:10.1038/s41556-026-01951-7. PMID 42230925.
- Tavernarakis N (2025). "For the love of frontier research, or why Elon's rockets keep blowing up". EMBO Reports. 26. doi:10.1038/s44319-025-00587-2. PMC 12549840. PMID 41023442.
- Tavernarakis N (2025). "Phase separation meets energy generation to boost longevity". Nature Aging. 5. doi:10.1038/s43587-025-00989-w. PMID 41044199.
- Konstantinidis G, Tavernarakis N (2025). "Nucleophagy: A two-step exit with the help of an outsider". Current Biology. 35: R331–R355. doi:10.1016/j.cub.2025.03.043. PMID 40328221.
- Hofer SJ, Daskalaki I, Bergmann M, Friscic J, Zimmermann A, Mueller MI, Abdellatif M, Nicastro R, Masser S, Durand S, Nartey A, Waltenstorfer M, Enzenhofer S, Faimann I, Gschiel V, Bajaj T, Niemeyer C, Gkikas I, Pein L, Cerrato G, Pan H, Liang YT, Tadic J, Jerkovic A, Aprahamian F, Robbins CE, Nirmalathasan N, Habisch H, Annerer E, Dethloff F, Stumpe M, Grundler F, Wilhelmi de Toledo F, Heinz DE, Koppold DA, Rajput Khokhar A, Michalsen A, Tripolt NJ, Sourij H, Pieber T, de Cabo R, McCormick M, Magnes C, Kepp O, Dengjel J, Sigrist SJ, Gassen NC, Sedej S, Madl T, De Virgilio C, Stelzl U, Hoffmann MH, Eisenberg T, Tavernarakis N, Kroemer G, Madeo F (2024). "Spermidine is essential for fasting-mediated autophagy and longevity". Nature Cell Biology. 26 (9): 1571–1584. doi:10.1038/s41556-024-01468-x. PMC 11392816. PMID 39117797.
- Charmpilas N, Sotiriou A, Axarlis K, Tavernarakis N, Hoppe T (2024). "Reproductive regulation of the mitochondrial stress response in Caenorhabditis elegans". Cell Reports. 43 (6) 114336. doi:10.1016/j.celrep.2024.114336. PMID 38852157.
- Daskalaki I, Markaki M, Gkikas I, Tavernarakis N (2023). "Local coordination of mRNA storage and degradation in the vicinity of mitochondria modulates Caenorhabditis elegans somatic ageing". EMBO Journal. 42 (16) e112446. doi:10.15252/embj.2022112446. PMC 10425844. PMID 37427543.
- Petratou D, Gjikolaj M, Kaulich E, Schafer W, Tavernarakis N (2023). "A proton-inhibited DEG/ENaC ion channel maintains neuronal ionstasis and promotes neuronal survival under stress". iScience. 26 (7) 107117. Bibcode:2023iSci...26j7117P. doi:10.1016/j.isci.2023.107117. PMC 10320524. PMID 37416472.
- Tavernarakis N (2023). "Remote control of autophagy and metabolism in the liver". Cell Metabolism. 35 (5): 725–72. doi:10.1016/j.cmet.2023.04.009. PMID 37137284.
- Ploumi C, Kyriakakis E, Tavernarakis N (2023). "Coupling of autophagy and the mitochondrial intrinsic apoptosis pathway modulates proteostasis and ageing in Caenorhabditis elegans". Cell Death and Disease. 14 (2) 110. doi:10.1038/s41419-023-05638-x. PMC 9922313. PMID 36774344.
- Palikaras K, Mari M, Ploumi C, Princz A, Filippidis G, Tavernarakis N (2023). "Age-dependent nuclear lipid droplet deposition is a cellular hallmark of aging in Caenorhabditis elegans". Aging Cell. 22 (4) e13788. doi:10.1111/acel.13788. PMC 10086520. PMID 36718841.
- Papandreou ME, Konstantinidis G, Tavernarakis N (2023). "Nucleophagy delays ageing and preserves germline immortality". Nature Aging. 3 (1): 34–46. doi:10.1038/s43587-022-00327-4. PMC 10154226. PMID 37118512.
- Lionaki E, Gkikas I, Daskalaki I, Ioannidi MK, Klapa MI, Tavernarakis N (2022). "Mitochondrial protein import determines lifespan through metabolic reprogramming and de novo serine biosynthesis". Nature Communications. 13 (1) 651. Bibcode:2022NatCo..13..651L. doi:10.1038/s41467-022-28272-1. PMC 8814026. PMID 35115503.
- Zaninello M, Palikaras K, Tavernarakis N, Scorrano L (2022). "Sustained intracellular calcium mediates neuronal mitophagy in models of autosomal dominant optic atrophy". Cell Death and Differentiation. 29 (1): 167–177. doi:10.1038/s41418-021-00847-3. PMC 8738763. PMID 34389813.
- SenGupta T, Palikaras K, Esbensen YQ, Konstantinidis G, Naranjo Galindo FJ, Achanta K, Kassahun H, Stavgiannoudaki I, Bohr VA, Akbari M, Gaare J, Tzoulis C, Tavernarakis N, Nilsen H (2021). "Base excision repair causes age-dependent accumulation of single-stranded DNA breaks that contribute to Parkinson's disease pathology". Cell Reports. 36 (10) 109668. doi:10.1016/j.celrep.2021.109668. PMC 8441048. PMID 34496255.
- Tavernarakis N (2020). "Inflammation brakes mitochondrial metabolism in obesity". Nature Immunology. 21 (10): 1143–1145. doi:10.1038/s41590-020-0780-8. PMID 32855554. S2CID 221359913.
- Zaninello M, Palikaras K, Naon D, Iwata K, Herkenne S, Quintana-Cabrera R, Semenzato M, Grespi F, Ross-Cisneros FN, Carelli V, Sadun AA, Tavernarakis N, Scorrano L (2020). "Inhibition of autophagy curtails visual loss in a model of autosomal dominant optic atrophy". Nature Communications. 11 (2) 4029. Bibcode:2020NatCo..11.4029Z. doi:10.1038/s41467-020-17821-1. PMC 7423926. PMID 32788597.
- Tavernarakis N (2019). "Ageing: Neural excitation moderates lifespan (Moderation of neural excitation promotes longevity)". Nature. 574 (7778): 338–340. doi:10.1038/d41586-019-02958-x. PMID 31619782.
- Charmpilas N, Tavernarakis N (2020). "Mitochondrial maturation drives germline stem cell differentiation in Caenorhabditis elegans". Cell Death and Differentiation. 27 (2): 601–617. doi:10.1038/s41418-019-0375-9. PMC 7206027. PMID 31217501.
- Papandreou ME, Tavernarakis N (2019). "Nucleophagy: from homeostasis to disease". Cell Death and Differentiation. 26 (4): 630–639. doi:10.1038/s41418-018-0266-5. PMC 6460388. PMID 30647432.
- Rieckher M, Markaki M, Princz A, Schumacher B, Tavernarakis N (2018). "Maintenance of proteostasis by P body-mediated regulation of eIF4E availability during ageing in Caenorhabditis elegans". Cell Reports. 25 (1): 199–211. doi:10.1016/j.celrep.2018.09.009. PMC 6180348. PMID 30282029.
- Palikaras K, Lionaki E, Tavernarakis N (2018). "Mechanisms of mitophagy in cellular homeostasis, physiology and pathology". Nature Cell Biology. 20 (9): 1013–1022. doi:10.1038/s41556-018-0176-2. PMID 30154567. S2CID 52113802.
- Nikoletopoulou V, Tavernarakis N (2018). "Regulation and roles of autophagy at synapses". Trends in Cell Biology. 28 (8): 230–42 646–661. doi:10.1016/j.tcb.2018.03.006. PMID 29731196. S2CID 19206766.
- Nikoletopoulou V, Sidiropoulou K, Kallergi E, Dalezios Y, Tavernarakis N (2017). "Modulation of autophagy by BDNF underlies synaptic plasticity". Cell Metabolism. 26 (1): 230–42. doi:10.1016/j.cmet.2017.06.005. PMID 28683289.
- Palikaras K, Lionaki E, Tavernarakis N (2015). "Coordination of mitophagy and mitochondrial biogenesis during ageing in C. elegans". Nature. 521 (7553): 525–8. Bibcode:2015Natur.521..525P. doi:10.1038/nature14300. PMID 25896323. S2CID 4451530.
- Nikoletopoulou V, Papandreou ME, Tavernarakis N (2015). "Autophagy in the physiology and pathology of the central nervous system". Cell Death and Differentiation. 22 (3): 398–407. doi:10.1038/cdd.2014.204. PMC 4326580. PMID 25526091.
- Palikaras K, Lionaki E, Tavernarakis N (2015). "Balancing mitochondrial biogenesis and mitophagy to maintain energy metabolism homeostasis". Cell Death and Differentiation. 22 (9): 1399–401. doi:10.1038/cdd.2015.86. PMC 4532782. PMID 26256515.
- Nikoletopoulou V, Kyriakakis E, Tavernarakis N (2014). "Cellular and molecular longevity pathways: the old and the new". Trends in Endocrinology and Metabolism. 25 (4): 212–23. doi:10.1016/j.tem.2013.12.003. PMID 24388148. S2CID 20494588.
- Kourtis N, Nikoletopoulou V, Tavernarakis N (2012). "Small heat-shock proteins protect from heat-stroke-associated neurodegeneration". Nature. 490 (7419): 213–8. Bibcode:2012Natur.490..213K. doi:10.1038/nature11417. PMID 22972192. S2CID 4404066.
- Troulinaki K, Tavernarakis N (2012). "Endocytosis and intracellular trafficking contribute to necrotic neurodegeneration in C. elegans". The EMBO Journal. 31 (3): 654–66. doi:10.1038/emboj.2011.447. PMC 3273398. PMID 22157748.
- Kourtis N, Tavernarakis N (2011). "Cellular stress response pathways and ageing: intricate molecular relationships". The EMBO Journal. 30 (13): 2520–31. doi:10.1038/emboj.2011.162. PMC 3155297. PMID 21587205.
- Madeo F, Tavernarakis N, Kroemer G (2010). "Can autophagy promote longevity?". Nature Cell Biology. 12 (9): 842–6. doi:10.1038/ncb0910-842. PMID 20811357. S2CID 22379286.
- Artal-Sanz M, Tavernarakis N (2009). "Prohibitin couples diapause signalling to mitochondrial metabolism during ageing in C. elegans". Nature. 461 (7265): 793–7. Bibcode:2009Natur.461..793A. doi:10.1038/nature08466. PMID 19812672. S2CID 4429858.
- Artal-Sanz M, Tavernarakis N (2009). "Prohibitin and mitochondrial biology". Trends in Endocrinology and Metabolism. 20 (8): 394–401. doi:10.1016/j.tem.2009.04.004. hdl:10261/17998. PMID 19733482. S2CID 26471154.
- Kourtis N, Tavernarakis N (2009). "Autophagy and cell death in model organisms". Cell Death and Differentiation. 16 (1): 21–30. doi:10.1038/cdd.2008.120. PMID 19079286.
- Voglis G, Tavernarakis N (2008). "A synaptic DEG/ENaC ion channel mediates learning in C. elegans by facilitating dopamine signalling". The EMBO Journal. 27 (24): 3288–99. doi:10.1038/emboj.2008.252. PMC 2609744. PMID 19037257.
- Tavernarakis N (2008). "Ageing and the regulation of protein synthesis: a balancing act?". Trends in Cell Biology. 18 (5): 228–35. doi:10.1016/j.tcb.2008.02.004. PMID 18346894.
- Samara C, Syntichaki P, Tavernarakis N (2008). "Autophagy is required for necrotic cell death in Caenorhabditis elegans". Cell Death and Differentiation. 15 (1): 105–12. doi:10.1038/sj.cdd.4402231. PMID 17901876.
- Syntichaki P, Troulinaki K, Tavernarakis N (2007). "eIF4E function in somatic cells modulates ageing in Caenorhabditis elegans". Nature. 445 (7130): 922–6. Bibcode:2007Natur.445..922S. doi:10.1038/nature05603. PMID 17277769. S2CID 4323753.
- Artal-Sanz M, Samara C, Syntichaki P, Tavernarakis N (2006). "Lysosomal biogenesis and function is critical for necrotic cell death in Caenorhabditis elegans". The Journal of Cell Biology. 173 (2): 231–9. doi:10.1083/jcb.200511103. PMC 2063814. PMID 16636145.
- Voglis G, Tavernarakis N (2006). "The role of synaptic ion channels in synaptic plasticity". EMBO Reports. 7 (11): 1104–10. doi:10.1038/sj.embor.7400830. PMC 1679792. PMID 17077866.
- Syntichaki P, Samara C, Tavernarakis N (2005). "The vacuolar H+ -ATPase mediates intracellular acidification required for neurodegeneration in C. elegans". Current Biology. 15 (13): 1249–54. doi:10.1016/j.cub.2005.05.057. PMID 16005300. S2CID 16500500.
- Syntichaki P, Tavernarakis N (2004). "Genetic models of mechanotransduction: the nematode Caenorhabditis elegans". Physiological Reviews. 84 (4): 1097–153. doi:10.1152/physrev.00043.2003. PMID 15383649.
- Syntichaki P, Tavernarakis N (2003). "The biochemistry of neuronal necrosis: rogue biology?". Nature Reviews. Neuroscience. 4 (8): 672–84. doi:10.1038/nrn1174. PMID 12894242. S2CID 17267485.
- Syntichaki P, Xu K, Driscoll M, Tavernarakis N (2002). "Specific aspartyl and calpain proteases are required for neurodegeneration in C. elegans". Nature. 419 (6910): 939–44. Bibcode:2002Natur.419..939S. doi:10.1038/nature01108. PMID 12410314. S2CID 4317198.
- Syntichaki P, Tavernarakis N (2002). "Death by necrosis. Uncontrollable catastrophe, or is there order behind the chaos?". EMBO Reports. 3 (7): 604–9. doi:10.1093/embo-reports/kvf138. PMC 1084192. PMID 12101090.
- Xu K, Tavernarakis N, Driscoll M (2001). "Necrotic cell death in C. elegans requires the function of calreticulin and regulators of Ca(2+) release from the endoplasmic reticulum". Neuron. 31 (6): 957–71. doi:10.1016/S0896-6273(01)00432-9. PMID 11580896. S2CID 14026924.
- Tavernarakis N, Everett JK, Kyrpides NC, Driscoll M (2001). "Structural and functional features of the intracellular amino terminus of DEG/ENaC ion channels". Current Biology. 11 (6): R205–8. Bibcode:2001CBio...11.R205T. doi:10.1016/S0960-9822(01)00106-3. PMID 11301263. S2CID 17346162.
- Driscoll M, Tavernarakis N (2000). "Closing in on a mammalian touch receptor". Nature Neuroscience. 3 (12): 1232–4. doi:10.1038/81746. PMID 11100138.
- Tavernarakis N, Wang SL, Dorovkov M, Ryazanov A, Driscoll M (2000). "Heritable and inducible genetic interference by double-stranded RNA encoded by transgenes". Nature Genetics. 24 (2): 180–3. doi:10.1038/72850. PMID 10655066. S2CID 24334113.
- Tavernarakis N, Driscoll M, Kyrpides NC (1999). "The SPFH domain: implicated in regulating targeted protein turnover in stomatins and other membrane-associated proteins". Trends in Biochemical Sciences. 24 (11): 425–7. doi:10.1016/S0968-0004(99)01467-X. PMID 10542406.
- Tavernarakis N, Driscoll M (1997). "Molecular modeling of mechanotransduction in the nematode Caenorhabditis elegans". Annual Review of Physiology. 59: 659–89. doi:10.1146/annurev.physiol.59.1.659. PMID 9074782.
- Tavernarakis N, Shreffler W, Wang S, Driscoll M (1997). "unc-8, a DEG/ENaC family member, encodes a subunit of a candidate mechanically gated channel that modulates C. elegans locomotion". Neuron. 18 (1): 107–19. doi:10.1016/S0896-6273(01)80050-7. PMID 9010209. S2CID 16667697.
