= Elizabeth Zachariadou =

Greek scholar on Turkish studies (1931–2018)

Elizabeth A. Zachariadou (Greek: Ελισάβετ Α. Ζαχαριάδου, 1931 – 26 December 2018) was a Greek scholar on Turkish studies, specializing in the early Ottoman Empire (ca. 1300–1600).

== Biography ==
In 1966, she married the Byzantinist Nikolaos Oikonomides (1934–2000), with whom she went to Canada following the 1967 coup and the establishment of the Regime of the Colonels in Greece.

After studying at the School of Oriental and African Studies at the University of London, she became professor of Turkish studies at the University of Crete from 1985 to 1998, and along with Vasilis Dimitriadis one of the co-founders of the Turkish Studies program of the Institute of Mediterranean Studies in Rethymno. In 1990, she received an honorary doctorate from the University of Ankara, and became a member of Academia Europaea in 1993.

== Works ==
- Το Χρονικό των Τούρκων Σουλτάνων (του βαρβερινού ελληνικού κώδικα 111) και το ιταλικό του πρότυπο ("The Chronicle of the Turkish Sultans (cod. gr. Barberini 111) and its Italian original"), Thessaloniki 1960
- Trade and Crusade, Venetian Crete and the Emirates of Menteshe and Aydin (1300-1415), Venice 1983
- Romania and the Turks (c.1300 - c.1500), Variorum Reprints, London 1985, ISBN 0-86078-159-3
- Ιστορία και θρύλοι των παλαιών σουλτάνων, 1300-1400 ("History and legends of the old sultans, 1300-1400"), Cultural Foundation of the National Bank of Greece, 1991 ISBN 978-960-250-059-0. (Second Edition 1999)
- Δέκα τουρκικά έγγραφα για την Μεγάλη Εκκλησία (1483-1567) - Ten Turkish documents concerning the Great Church (1483-1567), Hellenic National Research Institute: Institute for Byzantine Research, 1996, ISBN 978-960-7094-69-8
- Studies in pre-Ottoman Turkey and the Ottomans, Ashgate Variorum, 2007
- with Anthony Luttrell, Πηγές για την τουρκική ιστορία στα αρχεία των Ιπποτών της Ρόδου, 1389-1422 - Sources for Turkish History in the Hospitallers' Rhodian Archive, 1389-1422, Hellenic National Research Institute: Institute for Byzantine Research, 2009 ISBN 978-960-371-051-6
- with Gülsün Ayvali, Antonis Xanthynakis, Το χρονικό των Ουγγροτουρκικών πολέμων (1443-1444) ("Chronicle of the Hungarian-Ottoman wars (1443-1444)"), Crete University Press, Rethymno 2005, ISBN 978-960-524-217-6

As an editor, she was responsible for the publication of the first four international symposia held by the Turkish Studies program of the Institute of Mediterranean Studies:

- The Ottoman Emirate, ca. 1300–1389. Halcyon Days in Crete I: A Symposium Held in Rethymnon, 11–13 January 1991, Crete University Press, Rethymno 1994, ISBN 978-960-7309-58-7
- The Via Egnatia under Ottoman Rule, 1380–1699. Halcyon Days in Crete II: A Symposium Held in Rethymnon, 9–11 January 1994, Crete University Press, Rethymno 1997 ISBN 978-960-524-017-2
- Natural Disasters in the Ottoman Empire. Halcyon Days in Crete III: A Symposium Held in Rethymnon, 10–12 January 1997, Crete University Press, Rethymno 1999, ISBN 978-960-524-092-9
- The Kapudan Pasha: His Office and Ηis Domain. Halcyon Days in Crete IV: A Symposium held in Rethymnon, 7–9 January 2000, Crete University Press, Rethymno 2002, ISBN 978-960-524-151-3
