= Economos =

Economos is a surname of Greek origin. It is an Anglicized form of the word Oikonomos. Notable people with this surname include:

- Andrew Economos (born 1982), former American football long snapper
- Gérard Economos (1935-2016), Mexican artist of Greek origin

== See also ==
- Oikonomou
- Economo
