= Stavroula Foteinopoulou =

Greek physicist

Stavroula Foteinopoulou is a Greek physicist specializing in optics, including slow light and photonics. She is a research professor in the Department of Electrical and Computer Engineering at the University of New Mexico.

== Education and career ==
Foteinopoulou received a bachelor's degree in physics from the University of Patras in 1995, and a master's degree from the Rensselaer Polytechnic Institute in 1997. She completed a Ph.D. in condensed matter physics from Iowa State University in 2003.

After postdoctoral research at the University of Namur in Belgium and at the Foundation for Research & Technology – Hellas in Greece, she became a lecturer at the University of Exeter in England. In 2014 she moved to her present position at the University of New Mexico.

== Recognition ==
Foteinopoulou was named as a Fellow of SPIE in 2025.
