= Fotis Kafatos =

Greek biologist (1940–2017)

Fotis Kafatos FRS
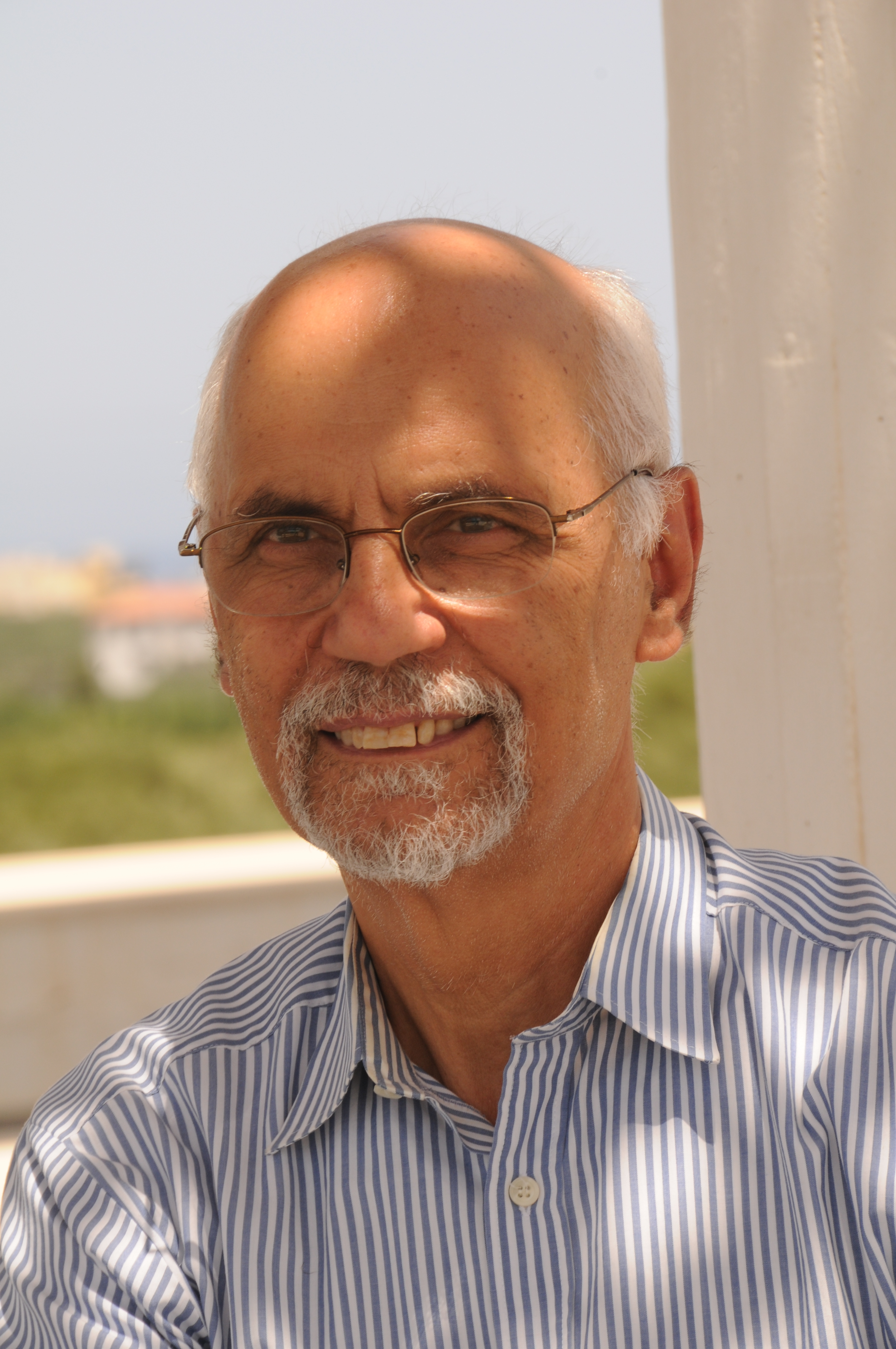
- Fotis Kafatos in 2008
- Born: Φώτης Κωνσταντίνος Καφάτος; Fotis Constantine Kafatos; 16 April 1940; Heraklion, Crete, Greece
- Died: 18 November 2017 (aged 77); Heraklion, Crete, Greece
- Education: Cornell University (BS); Harvard University (PhD)
- Awards: EMBO Member (1977); Robert Koch Prize (2010)
- Scientific career
- Workplaces: Imperial College London; European Research Council; Cornell University; Harvard University; European Molecular Biology Laboratory; University of Crete; Foundation for Research & Technology – Hellas
- Thesis: The escape of moths from the cocoon: biochemical, physiological, morphological, and developmental studies (1965)
- Doctoral advisor: Carroll Williams
- Other academic advisors: Thomas Eisner
- Website: openwetware.org/wiki/Kafatos:Fotis_C._Kafatos

Fotis Constantine Kafatos (Greek: Φώτης Κ. Καφάτος; 16 April 1940 – 18 November 2017) was a Greek biologist. Between 2007 and 2010, he was the founding president of the European Research Council (ERC). He chaired the ERC Scientific Council from 2006 to 2010. Thereafter, he was appointed Honorary President of the ERC. He was also an honorary fellow of the Hellenic Agricultural Academy.

== Education ==
Fotis Kafatos graduated from the Lyceum Korais in Heraklion in 1958 and from Cornell University in 1961, where he was mentored by Thomas Eisner and assisted by the Fulbright Program and a scholarship from Anne Gruner Schlumberger. He earned his PhD at Harvard in 1965 for research on entomology, supervised by Carroll Williams.

== Research and career ==
Fotis Kafatos was an influential Greek biologist, having had a pivotal role in triggering the interest of the Greek government for Science, with the establishment of the Faculty of Biology in the University of Athens, the Faculty of Biology in the University of Crete and the IMBB in Heraklion.

At the beginning of his career, he contributed to the development of the complementary DNA (cDNA) cloning technology and worked on the mechanisms of cellular differentiation leading to the formation of the eggs in insects. He has particular interest in malaria research and used his knowledge of the genetics and molecular biology of insects to understand how the insect vector copes with the Plasmodium parasite. He also participated in the sequencing of the genome of the mosquito Anopheles gambiae completed in 2002.

He was assistant professor and later professor and chairman of the department of Cellular and Developmental Biology of Harvard University, professor of biology at the University of Athens and at the University of Crete, director of the Institute of Molecular Biology and Biotechnology (IMBB) of the Foundation for Research & Technology – Hellas in Heraklion and third director-general of the European Molecular Biology Laboratory from 1993 to 2005. From 2005 till his death, he had been a professor at Imperial College in London. In 2007, he was appointed as the first President of the European Research Council.

=== Awards and honours ===
Kafatos was a member of the US National Academy of Sciences since 1982 and of the American Academy. He was elected a Foreign Member of the Royal Society (ForMemRS) in 2003 and was also a member of the French Académie des Sciences, the Pontifical Academy and the European Molecular Biology Organization (EMBO). He was awarded the Louis-Jeantet 25th anniversary prize in 2008, the Robert Koch Medal in Gold in 2010, the BioMalPar.EviPalaR Lifetime Achievement Award in 2011, and the Leibnitz Medal in 2011. He was also a recipient of the Order of Merit of the Federal Republic of Germany and of the Greek Order of the Phoenix, as well as other awards and honorary degrees in Greece and elsewhere.

== Personal life ==
Fotis Kafatos was the son of Constantine and Helen Kafatos, had two brothers named Antonis and Menas, and lived until age 18 with his family in Heraklion, Crete, Greece. He married Sarah Niles in 1967 and they had two daughters, Helen and Zoe Myrto, and four grandchildren, George, Sophia, Arthur, and Anna.
