= Skinakas Observatory =

Astronomical observatory of the University of Crete, located on Mt. Ida, Greece

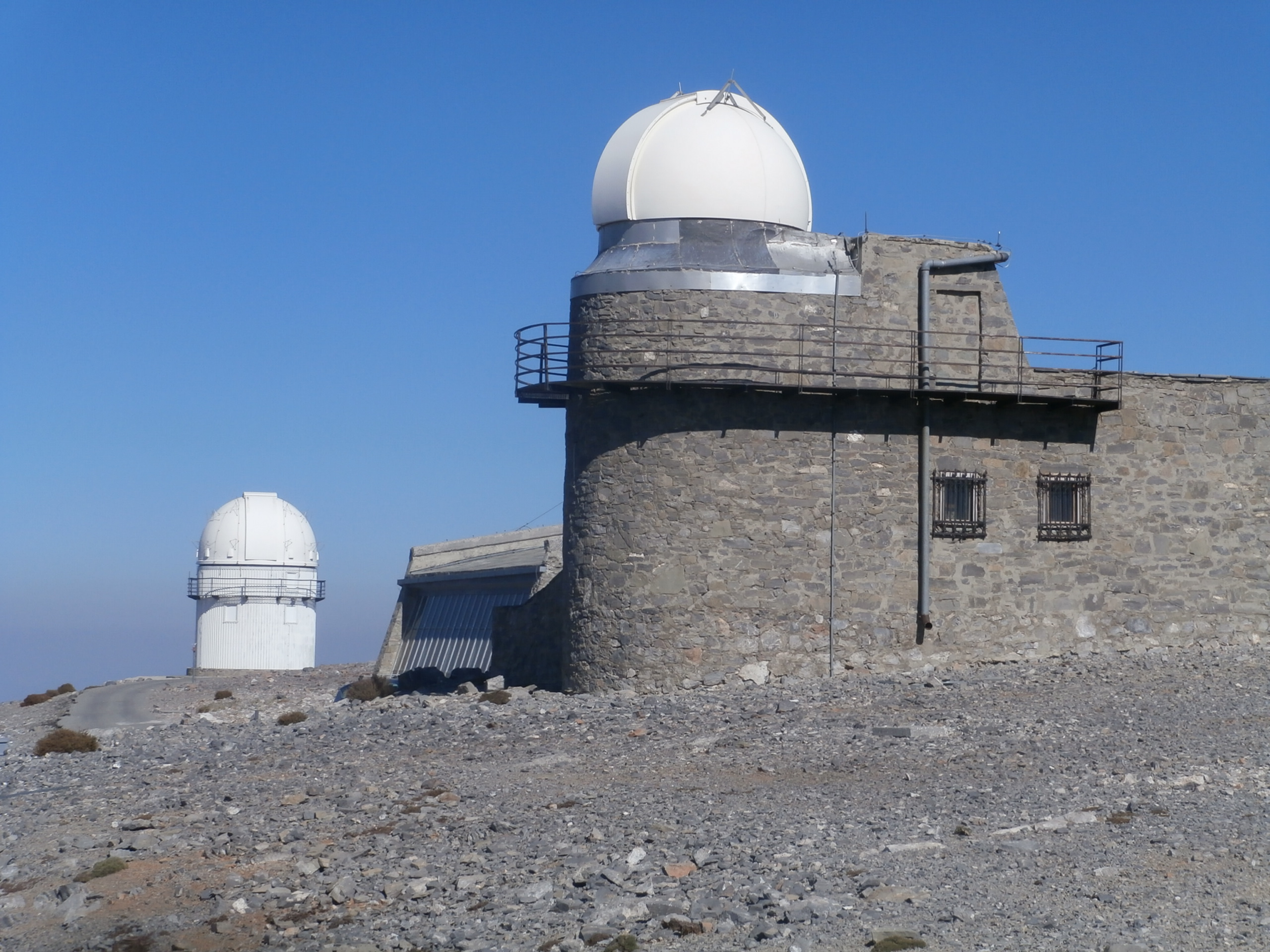
- Named after: Skinakas
- Organization: Foundation for Research & Technology – Hellas; University of Crete
- Location: Crete, Greece
- Coordinates: 35.2120°N 24.8982°E
- Altitude: 1,750 m (5,740 ft)
- Established: 1986
- Website: skinakas.physics.uoc.gr/en/

Telescopes
- Unnamed: 1.3 m Ritchey–Chrétien
- 200+ (Note: "200+" is the name of a single telescope, there aren't two hundred telescopes in the observatory.): 1.0 m Ritchey–Chrétien
- Ganymede: 0.6 m Cassegrain
- Unnamed: 0.3 m Schmidt–Cassegrain
- Related media on Commons

Skinakas Observatory (Greek: Αστεροσκοπείο Σκίνακα) is an astronomical observatory located on the eponymous peak of Psiloritis, on the island of Crete, Greece. It is equipped with a 1.3 m modified Ritchey–Chrétien telescope and another 1 m Ritchey–Chrétien, a 0.6 m Cassegrain telescope and a 0.3 m Schmidt–Cassegrain. The telescopes are operated by the University of Crete and the Foundation for Research & Technology – Hellas. The Skinakas Observatory has the highest paved road in Crete (1,750 m).

== History ==
The idea to create a site of astronomical research at Skinakas was conceived in the summer of 1984. Soon after the construction of a road to the mountain peak commenced. The University of Crete, the Foundation for Research and Technology - Hellas (FORTH, former Research Center of Crete) and the Max-Planck-Institut für Extraterrestrische Physik (Germany) agreed to build and operate together a telescope with the purpose of providing modern education in Astronomy to University students and also of supporting astronomical observations with emphasis on the research of extended sky objects such as comets and gaseous nebulae. The first Director of Skinakas Observatory was Prof. Ioannis Papamastorakis, who led the development of the Observatory until his retirement in 2009.

The expected arrival of comet Halley in the Spring of 1986, after 76 years of wandering through the Solar System, set the time schedule for the installation of the telescope, which having a wide field of view, and equipped with a highly sensitive electronic camera was especially suited for the observation of the comet. Indeed, after the construction of the road on the rocky mountain and the completion of the first stone-made observatory, hundreds of people from all over Greece, among them many officials (including Vasso Papandreou, then Alternate Minister of Industry, Energy and Technology), came to Skinakas in the Spring 1986, in order to participate in the inauguration ceremony of the Observatory on April 12, 1986, as well as to observe comet Halley. In 1988 the construction of the guesthouse, also made out of stone, was completed and immediately hosted the first school of Observational Astrophysics in Greece.

The successful installation and operation of the first small, 0.3m diameter telescope, confirmed the excellent weather conditions at the top of Skinakas for high quality astronomical observations in the Mediterranean region. As a result, the partner institutions decided to further develop the Observatory by installing a larger and more modern Ritchey-Chrétien type telescope with a mirror diameter of 1.3 meters. The telescope, which was inaugurated and commenced operations on October 21, 1995, was placed in a metal building to minimize local thermal disturbances (atmospheric turbulence). The 1.3m telescope was built using high standards of sharpness and wide field of view. These properties ensure excellent imagery and study of extended objects such as galaxies, star clusters and gaseous nebulae. To further improve the observation of extended objects, a focal reducer had been developed which nearly doubles the field of view while offering the possibility of spectroscopy.

In 2006, in collaboration with the University of Tuebingen, a third 0.6m telescope was installed. This Cassegrain telescope, called "Ganymede" is fully robotic and web-driven and has a 29.3′×19.5′ field of view. The telescope was operating until 2013 when the dome was severely damage due to adverse weather conditions. In the following years funds were secured, the old building was replaced by a new larger one, along with a fast 5.3m diameter dome which was built, as the other two that house the 0.3m and 1.3m telescopes, by Baader Planetarium. The robotic telescope was also fully refurbished and became operational once again on May 16, 2022.

As of 2000, the power needs of the observatory are served from a photovoltaic system which provides 11kW peak power and charges a flooded lead-acid battery system with a capacity of ~120 kW·h. Three full sine wave inverters from 48VDC to 220VAC (two 4KVA and one 10KVA) power the needs of the facility. In addition, two diesel generators, of 40kVA and 22kVA power respectively, are used in case of emergency.

Since 2019 the operation of Skinakas Observatory is supported by the personnel of the Institute of Astrophysics - FORTH and of the Dept. of Physics, of the Univ. of Crete. Its current director is Prof. Vasiliki Pavlidou. Previous Directors of Skinakas Observatory were Prof. J. Papamastorakis (1984-2009), Prof. J. Papadakis (2009-2019) and Prof. V. Charmandaris (2019-2025).

On September 29, 2019, the guesthouse of the observatory was officially renamed by the Rector of the Univ. of Crete, Prof. P. Tsakalides, to "Ioannis Papamastorakis Guest House". This honour recognized the seminal role of Ioannis Papamastorakis, Emeritus Professor at the Dept. of Physics of the Univ. of Crete and Director of Skinakas Observatory from 1984 until 2009, in conceiving the idea to create the first research observatory of a University in Greece and making it a reality. The event coincided with the 35-year anniversary of the founding of Skinakas Observatory, as well as 10 years since the retirement of Prof. Papamastorakis.

Since 2023, the ESA project SkinUP upgrades the Skinakas Observatory to optical and quantum communication with low Earth orbit satellites. The work is carried out by the Space Optics Laboratory. Once completed, it will be an ESA optical ground station. It will be able to download at speeds of 200 Mbit/s via a laser link using space-to-ground Free-space optical communication. Quantum communication will be enabled by establishing a quantum cryptographic channel using a series of single photons.

In October 2021, the "Greece 2021" Committee visited the observatory and about year later donated €1.000.000 for the construction of an education centre and €500.000 for the purchase of a new telescope. The education centre was named Asteroscholeio and it is expected to be completed by 2025 (see § Asteroscholeio). The telescope was named "200+" and it is operational at the observatory since November 2024. It is a 1.0m Ritchey–Chrétien telescope manufactured by ASA Astrosysteme GmbH and it is used for research and educational purposes, as well as for satellite tracking and laser communications.

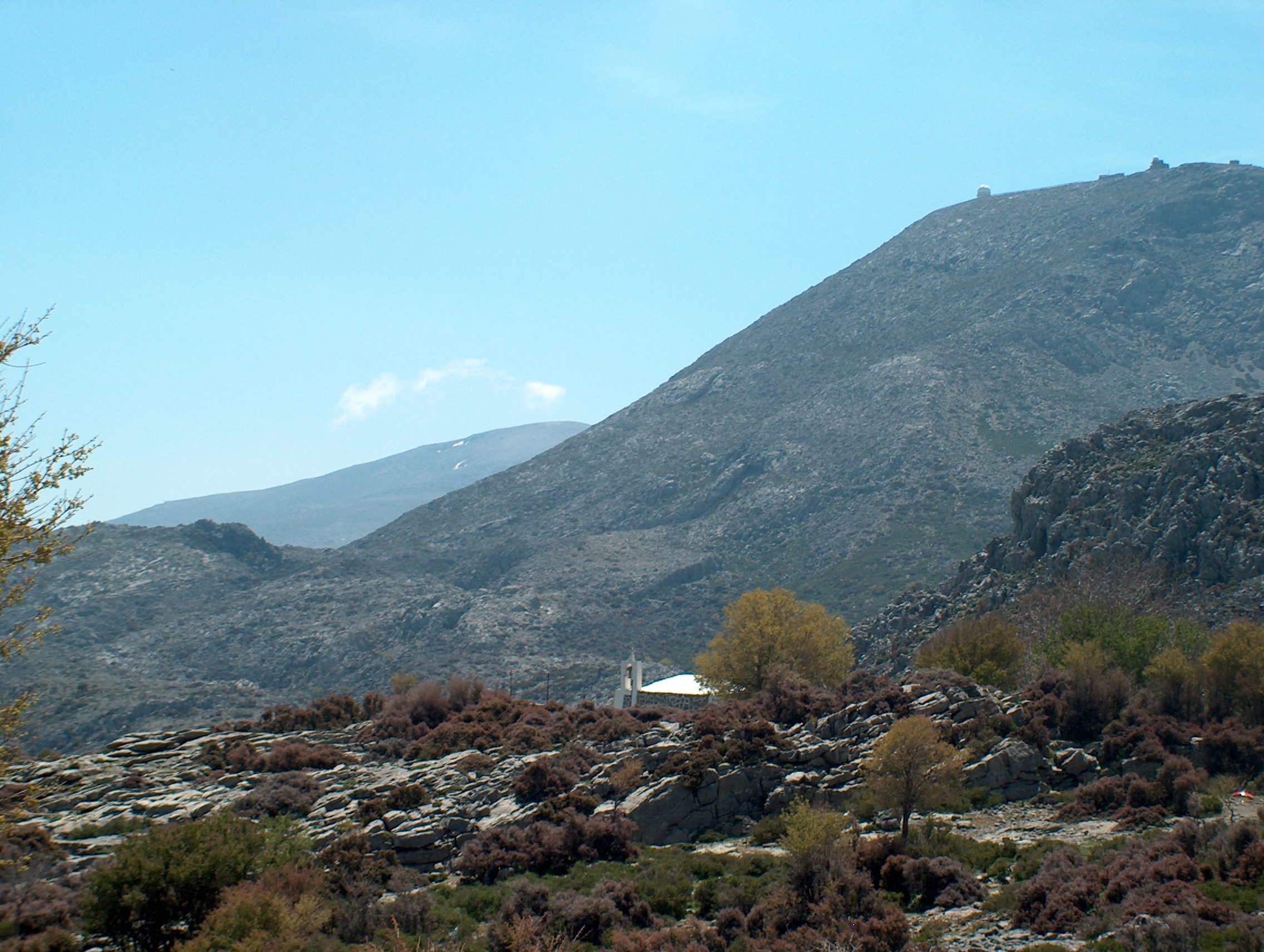
View from afar.

== Instruments ==
Currently the instrumentation of the 1.3m telescope equipment includes:

- a focal reducer that doubles the telescope's field of view and allows low resolution spectroscopy.
- an autoguider.
- three water cooled Andor CCD cameras 2048x2048 pixels (13.5 μm / pixel) and one auxiliary SBIG CCD camera 3072×2048 pixels (9 μm / pixel)
- a complete set of narrow and wide optical filters
- a near-infrared camera with a large field of view (7×7 arcmin)
- a three band optical polarimeter (Robopol)
- a wide field optical polarimeter (Walop) -- under construction
- Optical Communication Ground station (OGS) -- under construction
- Quantum Key Distribution Capability -- under construction

== Research areas ==
The main observational programs currently running at the Observatory include the study of:

- interacting galaxies, active galactic nuclei
- planetary nebulae
- supernova remnants
- binary stars with one member being a white dwarf, a neutron star, or a black hole
- study of magnetic field and dust in our Galaxy by optical polarimetry
- variability and acceleration mechanisms in blazar jets

Skinakas Observatory is the most productive in research results in Greece. By the end of 2025 data from its telescopes have contributed to 314 refereed publications. In addition, observations from the Observatory had been used to complete 15 PhD dissertations.

== Education ==
The Observatory is used for the practical training and teaching needs of undergraduate students of the Department of Physics of the University of Crete, as well as for postgraduate research programs. The Observatory hosted the 2016 NEON summer school. In addition, since 1996 and during the summer months, regular "Open Days" have been organised during which the public can visit the facilities of the Observatory and, weather permitting, observe through the 1.3m telescope using an eyepiece.

=== Asteroscholeio ===
The Asteroscholeio (Greek: Αστεροσχολείο, lit. Star-school) is an educational centre under construction at the observatory since June 2023. It was financed by a €1.000.000 donation of the "Greece 2021" Committee and it will be operated by the Foundation for Research & Technology – Hellas and the University of Crete in collaboration with the municipality of Anogeia. It will consist of a 360 m^{2} building which includes a hall of 85 seats. When completed in 2026, it is expected to be a major astrotourism destination as well as a location to support educational and cultural activities for the local community.

== See also ==
- List of astronomical observatories
