= George Economou (scientist) =

Optical systems expert

George Aristotle Economou
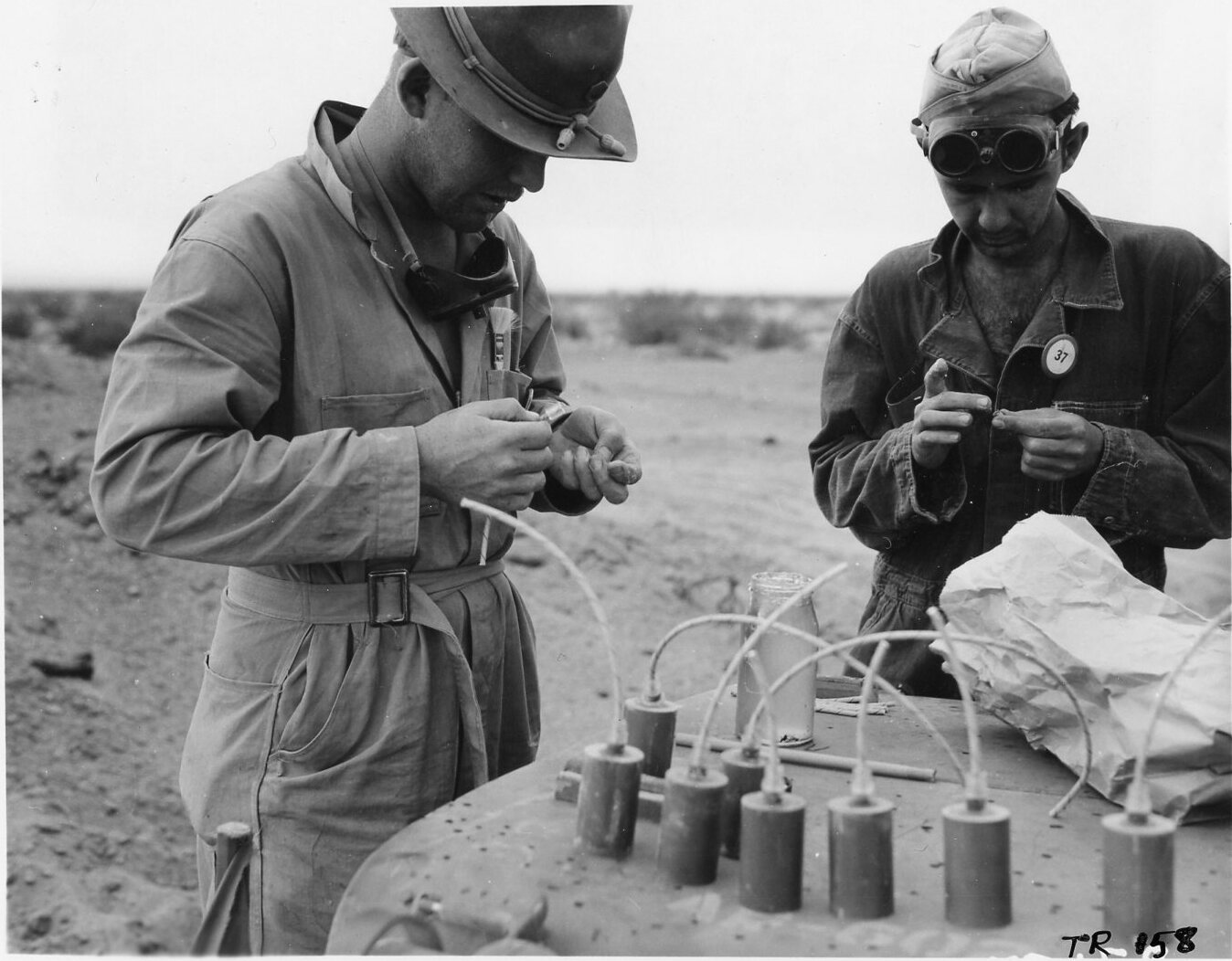
- Benjamin C. Benjamin and George A. Economou (right) preparing Torpex charges
- Born: June 24, 1923; Manchester, New Hampshire, US
- Died: April 2, 2003 (aged 79); Allegheny General Hospital, Pittsburgh, Pennsylvania, US
- Known for: Helping to conceptualize and set up special cameras to photograph and study the first test of the atomic bomb in 1945
- Scientific career
- Institutions: Polaroid Corporation; Los Alamos, New Mexico; and Contraves Goerz Corporation

George Aristotle Economou (June 24, 1923 – April 2, 2003) was an American optical systems expert, who helped set up special cameras to photograph and study the first test of the atomic bomb in 1945. He was instrumental in the development of the atomic bomb at Los Alamos, working on the Manhattan Project under scientific director Robert Oppenheimer.

== Life ==
Born in 1923 in Manchester, New Hampshire, Economou built his first telescope at the age of 12. After studying astronomy and astrophysics at Harvard University, his career began at the Polaroid Corporation. In 1944, he joined the United States Army and was assigned to Los Alamos, New Mexico, where he helped conceptualize camera lenses used to photograph bomb tests.

At Contraves, he was later involved in the design of ground station optical instrumentation for GEODSS.

Economou officially retired in 1990 as Group Vice President, Optical Instruments for the Contraves Goerz Corporation in O'Hara Township, Pennsylvania, but continued to work on some of the industry's more high-profile projects, such as consulting for design and construction of the Large Millimeter Telescope. He died of lung cancer aged 79 on April 2, 2003, at Allegheny General Hospital.
