= Ira Goldberg =

American endocrinologist

Ira J. Goldberg is an American endocrinologist. Goldberg earned his MD from Harvard Medical School and holds the Clarissa and Edgar Bronfman Jr. Professorship of Endocrinology at the New York University Grossman School of Medicine.
