= Sophia Economou =

American physicist and academic

Sophia E. Economou
- Education: University of California, San Diego
- Scientific career
- Workplaces: United States Naval Research Laboratory; Virginia Tech
- Thesis: Spontaneous emission and optical control of spins in quantum dots (2006)

Sophia E. Economou is a Greek-American physicist who is a professor and the T. Marshall Hahn Chair in Physics at Virginia Tech. She directs the Virginia Tech Center for Quantum Information Science and Engineering.

== Early life and education ==
Economou was a BSci. student at the University of Crete, Greece, graduating in 2000 and a doctoral student at the University of California, San Diego, where she studied quantum dots. In particular, she was interested in spins in quantum dots, which could be manipulated optically. After graduating, she moved to the United States Naval Research Laboratory as a postdoctoral researcher and staff member, where she worked on quantum computing and quantum photonics.

== Research and career ==
Economou directs the Virginia Tech Center for Quantum Information Science and Engineering. Her research develops algorithms that can use noisy quantum computers to predict the properties of new molecular materials.

Economou is committed to educating a new generation of quantum scientists, and created a first year course on quantum information science.

== Recognition ==
Economou was named a Fellow of the American Physical Society in 2023, "for the development of quantum optimization methods, protocols for the generation of photonic resource states, efficient quantum control schemes for spins and nuclei, and a quantum curriculum for young researchers".

== Selected publications ==
- Harper R Grimsley; Sophia E Economou; Edwin Barnes; Nicholas J Mayhall (2019). "An adaptive variational algorithm for exact molecular simulations on a quantum computer". Nature Communications. 10 (1): 3007. arXiv:1812.11173. Bibcode:2019NatCo..10.3007G. doi:10.1038/s41467-019-10988-2. PMC 6614426. PMID 31285433. Wikidata Q91722418.
- Ehud Altman; Kenneth R. Brown; Giuseppe Carleo; et al. (2021). "Quantum Simulators: Architectures and Opportunities". PRX Quantum. 2 (1). arXiv:1912.06938. doi:10.1103/prxquantum.2.017003. Wikidata Q108282166.
- M V Gurudev Dutt; Jun Cheng; Bo Li; et al. (2005). "Stimulated and spontaneous optical generation of electron spin coherence in charged GaAs quantum dots". Physical Review Letters. 94 (22) 227403. arXiv:cond-mat/0504039. doi:10.1103/physrevlett.94.227403. PMID 16090438. Wikidata Q81032584.
