= Foundation for Research & Technology – Hellas =

Research centre in Greece

- Ίδρυμα Τεχνολογίας και Έρευνας
- Formation: 1983; 43 years ago
- Type: Public
- Purpose: Research
- Headquarters: Heraklion, Crete
- Location: 100 Nikolaou Plastira str., Vassilika Vouton
- Fields: Computer science Applied mathematics Biology; Physics; Engineering
- President: Vassilis Charmandaris
- Staff: 1,551 researchers
- Website: www.forth.gr

The Foundation for Research & Technology – Hellas (FORTH; Greek: Ίδρυμα Τεχνολογίας και Έρευνας – ΙΤΕ) is a research center in Greece, supervised by the Ministry of Development through its General Secretariat for Research and Innovation. It is the largest research center in Greece, consisting of nine research institutes, which are located in Heraklion, Rethymno, Patras, Ioannina, Chania and Athens. The foundation's headquarters, as well as the central administration offices, are located in Heraklion, Crete.

Established in 1983, FORTH is today internationally known and one of the largest research organizations in Greece. FORTH's research and technological focus is on areas of scientific, social, and economic interest, such as astrophysics, computer science, molecular biology, lasers, telecommunications, microelectronics, robotics, biotechnology, materials, medical engineering, applied and computational mathematics, biomedical research, Mediterranean Studies, and historical studies. FORTH also operates Crete University Press, an independent non-profit scientific publishing house.

== History ==
The idea for FORTH was developed by five Greek scientists who had been working abroad: Eleftherios Economou, Fotis Kafatos, Dionysios Tsichritzis, Grigoris Sifakis, and Panagiotis Lambropoulos. With the help of the Minister of Research and Technology, Georgios Lianis, they convinced the Greek Government to create the Research Center of Crete (RCC) in Heraklion in 1983.

The RCC expanded rapidly with an Institute of Mediterranean Studies (IMS) in Rethymno and an Institute of Applied Computational Mathematics in Heraklion. In 1986, Skinakas Observatory, jointly supported by RCC, the University of Crete and the Max Planck Institute for Extraterrestrial Physics (Germany) also commenced its operations. In 1987, with the agreement of the directors of the Institute of Chemical Engineering and High Temperature Processes (ICE/HT) in Patras and the Chemical Process Engineering Research Institute (CPERI) in Thessaloniki, the two institutes joined RCC, thus creating FORTH. In 2002, the Biomedical Research Institute (BRI), based in Ioannina was incorporated into the organisation. In parallel, with financial support from the European Union, the construction of the FORTH buildings in Heraklion, Patras, Thessaloniki, and the restoration of the IMS building in Rethymno began.

With the initiative and cooperation of FORTH with the General Secretariat for Research and Technology, Science and Technology Parks were established, connected to the Institutes in Heraklion, Patras, and Thessaloniki and respective buildings with European funding were erected. The main FORTH building infrastructure in Heraklion in 2004 had an area of 30,000 square meters. Most of the buildings were designed and supervised by Panos Koulermos, then a professor of architecture at the University of Southern California. In 2018, the Institute of Astrophysics and the Institute of Petroleum Research were also founded as part of FORTH, while in 2022 the Hellenic Institute of Human Genomics was created in Athens.

Over the years, FORTH has been established as the premier research organisation in Greece, ranking consistently first in scientific quality and international recognition by a variety of metrics, including evaluations by external Committees as well as attracting funding by European Research Council grants.

== Institutes ==
FORTH currently consists of the following research institutes:

- Institute of Applied and Computational Mathematics - IACM
- Institute of Astrophysics - IA
- Institute of Chemical Engineering Sciences - ICE/HT
- Institute of Computer Science - ICS
- Institute of Electronic Structure and Laser - IESL
- Institute of Mediterranean Studies - IMS
- Institute of Molecular Biology & Biotechnology - IMBB
- Biomedical Research Institute - BRI
- Institute of Geoenergy - IG
- Greek Institute of Human Genomics

From 1987 to 2000, the Chemical Process Engineering Research Institute (CPERI), based in Thessaloniki, was also part of FORTH. In 2000, CPERI was separated from FORTH to become a founding member of a new research center, the National Centre for Research and Technology-Hellas (CERTH).

== Directors ==
The position of the Director of FORTH and Chairperson of the Governing Council was held by the following individuals:

- Eleftherios N. Economou, 1983-2004
- Stelios Orphanoudakis, 2004-2005
- Alkiviades C. Payatakes, 2005-2009
- Vassilios A. Dougalis, 2010-2011 (Acting Director)
- Costas Fotakis, 2011-2016
- Nektarios Tavernarakis, 2016–2025
- Vassilis Charmandaris, 2025-present
