= Crete University Press =

Academic publisher

- Parent company: Pancretan Association of America; Foundation for Research & Technology – Hellas
- Founded: 1984
- Country of origin: Greece
- Publication types: Books
- Official website: cup.gr/about-us/

Crete University Press is a university press co-organized and operated by the Pancretan Association of America and the Foundation for Research & Technology – Hellas (FORTH). The press is a non-profit organization supported entirely by the sale of its books. Crete University Press is a member of the International Association of University Presses.

== See also ==
- List of university presses
