= University of Crete =

Institution in Crete, Greece

Coordinates: 35.3070°N 25.0820°E

- Πανεπιστήμιο Κρήτης
- Type: Public higher education institution
- Established: 1973; 52 years ago
- Rector: Georgios Kontakis
- Academic staff: 548
- Administrative staff: 420
- Undergraduates: 20,000
- Postgraduates: 2,500
- Location: Rethymno, Crete, Greece
- Campus: Galos, Rethymnon and Voutes, Heraklion
- Affiliations: FORTH, INGENIUM
- Website: www.uoc.gr

The University of Crete (UoC; Greek: Πανεπιστήμιο Κρήτης) is a multi-disciplinary, research-oriented institution in Crete, Greece, located in the cities of Rethymno (official seat) and Heraklion.

There are 16 main undergraduate degree programmes corresponding to the university's departments and more than 30 master's programmes.

As of 2017, there is a student population of 16.000 registered undergraduates and 2.500 registered postgraduates, more than 500 Faculty members as well as approximately 420 administrative staff.

== Overview ==
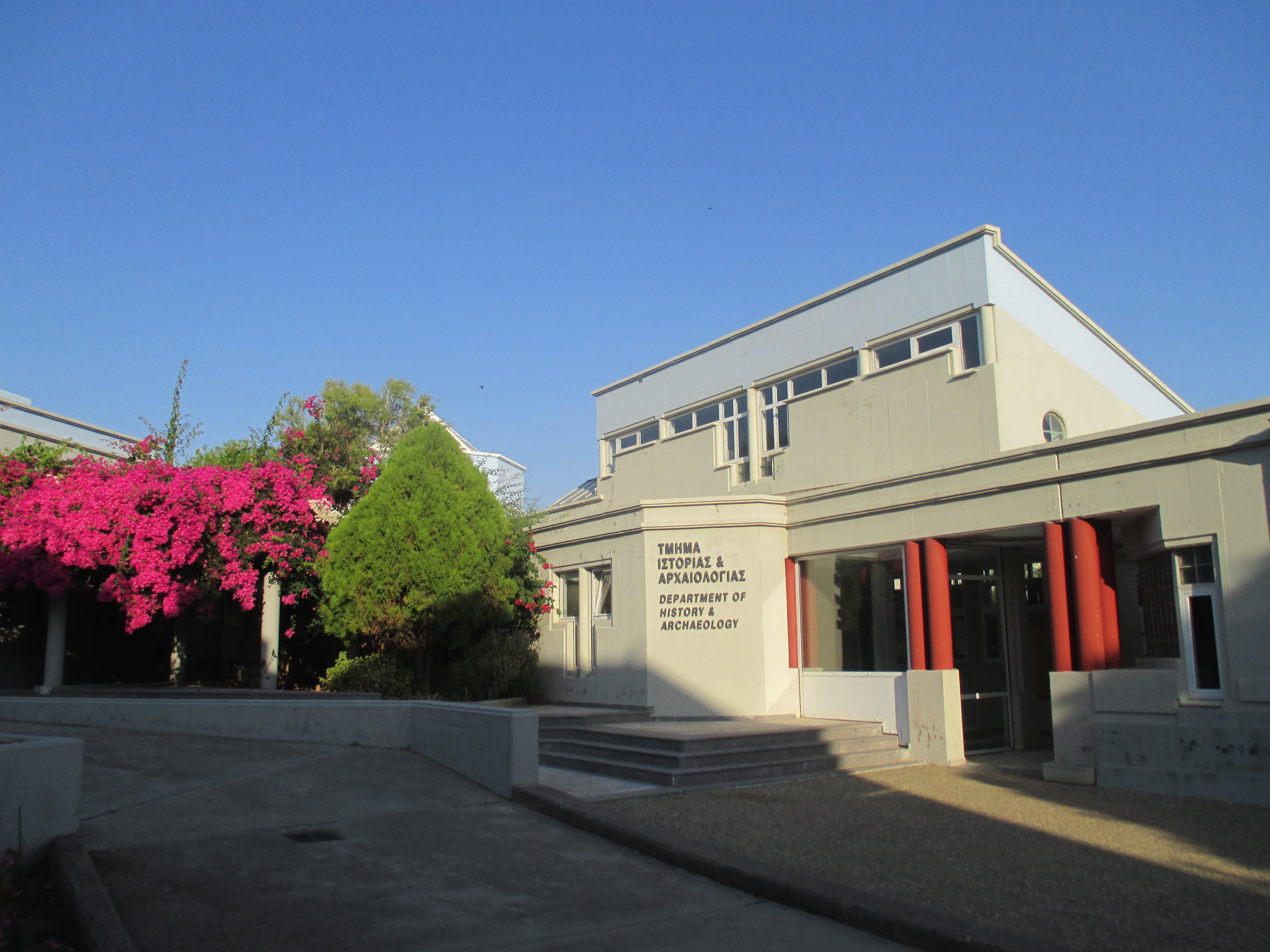
Department of History and Archaeology

The University of Crete was established in 1973 and started functioning in the academic year 1977–78.

As with all universities in Greece, the University of Crete is a public university and as such it operates under the supervision of the state and all its educational activities, as well as a part of its research activities, rely upon government funding. The supreme administrative body of the university is the Senate, which is presided over by the rector of the university. The head of the university is the rector, who is assisted by three vice-rectors in the exercise of his duties; all four together form the institution's high authority. They are elected for a period of four years by the teaching staff and representatives of the student body.

Although still very young, the University of Crete has already shown its commitment in the evolving process of European integration, and it operates as an integral member of the European Research and Education Areas. It is currently coordinating and participating in European Union programs and activities such as ERASMUS, LINGUA, and TEMPUS and has important links and cooperations with other Mediterranean and Eastern European countries as well as with many American universities and colleges, through international programmes.

The university encourages active participation in cultural and athletic activities. The student union also operates a radio station.

== Emblem ==
The emblem of the University of Crete is based on a Hellenistic coin found in Gortyn (430–300 BC) and depicts Europa in reflective stance while sitting on olive tree branches. The emblem was designed in a medal by the sculptor Aspasia Papadoperaki.

== Faculties and departments ==
The university has sixteen departments organised in five schools according to related disciplines.

Its two campuses are located near two towns on the north coast of the island, Galos in Rethymno and Voutes in Heraklion.

School	Department	Founded	References
School of Philosophy (founded 1977) (Rethymno)	Philology	1983	
School of Philosophy (founded 1977) (Rethymno)	History and Archaeology	1983	
School of Philosophy (founded 1977) (Rethymno)	Philosophy	1983	
School of Social Sciences (founded 1987) (Rethymno)	Sociology	1987	
School of Social Sciences (founded 1987) (Rethymno)	Economics	1987	
School of Social Sciences (founded 1987) (Rethymno)	Political Science	1999	
School of Social Sciences (founded 1987) (Rethymno)	Psychology	1987	
School of Education (founded 1995) (Rethymno)	Primary Education	1984	
School of Education (founded 1995) (Rethymno)	Preschool Education	1987	
School of Sciences and Engineering (founded 1976) (Heraklion)	Mathematics and Applied Mathematics	2013	
School of Sciences and Engineering (founded 1976) (Heraklion)	Physics	1978	
School of Sciences and Engineering (founded 1976) (Heraklion)	Computer Science	1984	
School of Sciences and Engineering (founded 1976) (Heraklion)	Biology	1981	
School of Sciences and Engineering (founded 1976) (Heraklion)	Chemistry	1985	
School of Sciences and Engineering (founded 1976) (Heraklion)	Materials Science and Engineering	2001	
School of Medicine (founded 1984) (Heraklion)	School of Medicine	1984	

== Research ==
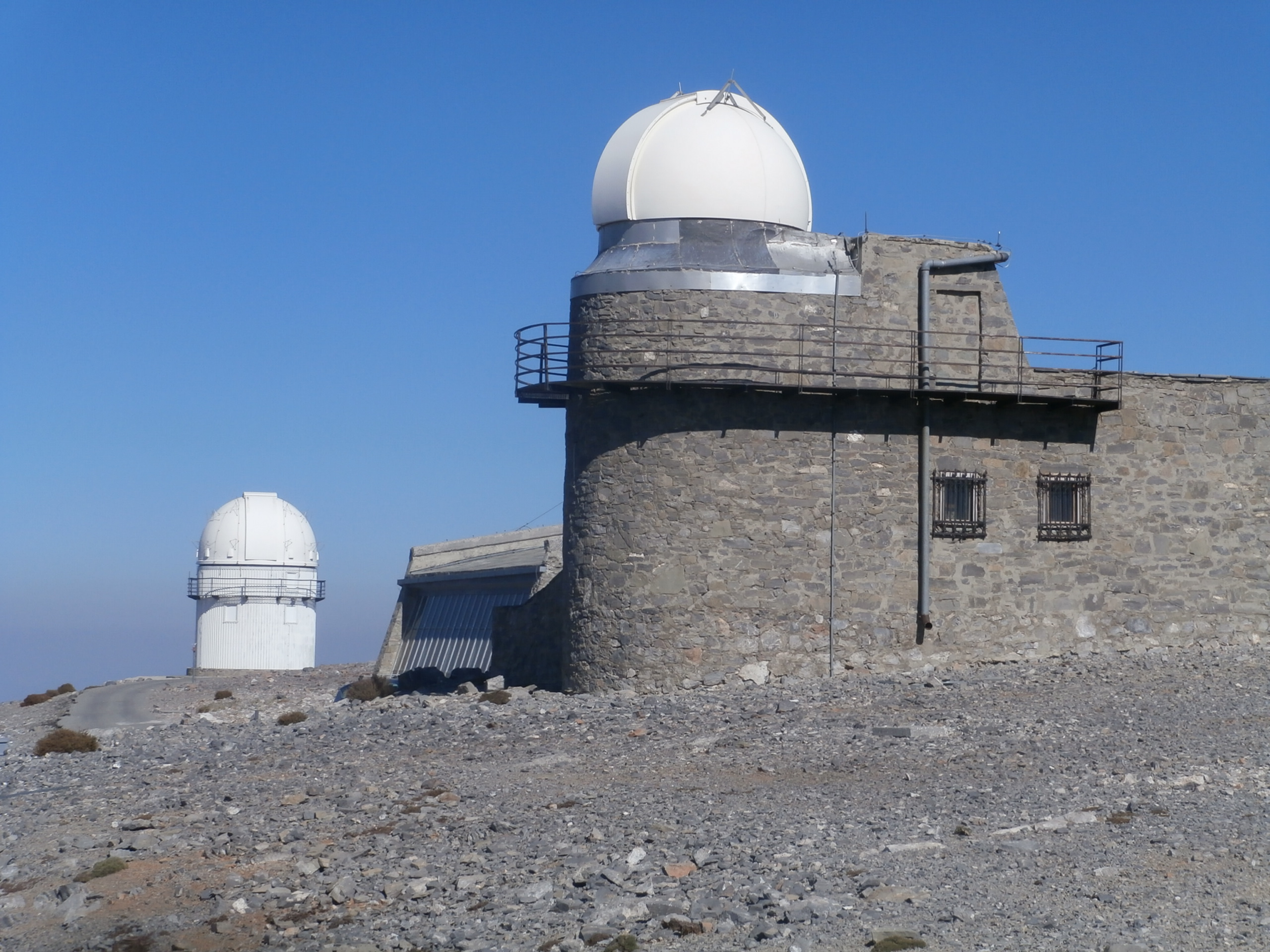
Skinakas Observatory on the Mount Ida: research facility of the University of Crete and the Foundation for Research & Technology – Hellas

The University of Crete is well known both nationally and internationally for its state-of-the-art research and graduate programmes.

Research and research training in Crete benefits from an academic and technological environment of international standards, built up over the last 40 years through the cluster of research-oriented institutions in the region. These provide a critical mass of expertise in AHSS as well as STEM disciplines and access to excellent complementary facilities for research and research training in highly competitive fields and interaction with industry partners.

It is considered one of the best universities in Greece mainly due to its research influence: it ranks in the top 400 Universities of the World by the Times Higher Education (THE) list, and also in the top 100 universities under 50 years by the QS World University Rankings.

On several research topics the University of Crete collaborates closely with FO.R.T.H.

The Natural History Museum of Crete, established in 1981 at Heraklion, is also part of the University of Crete.

== Academic evaluation ==
University rankings

Global – Overall
- ARWU World: 701–800 (2023)
- QS World: =628 (2026)
- THE World: 501–600 (2024)
- USNWR Global: 605 (2023)

National – Overall
- THE National: 1 (2024)

An external evaluation of all academic departments in Greek universities was conducted by the Hellenic Quality Assurance and Accreditation Agency (HQAA) in the years 2008–2014 and, according to these results, the University of Crete, was characterised as a "Center of Excellence".

In 2016 the external evaluation of the institution cited University of Crete as Worthy of merit.

The reports are publicly available.

According to the Times Higher Education (THE) rankings, University of Crete has held the top position nationally since 2023, ranking first in the fields of Medicine and Dentistry, Psychology, Chemistry, Physics & Astronomy, General engineering, Geology, Environmental, Earth & Marine sciences, Education, Language, Literature & Linguistics, Sociology, Politics & International studies, Archaeology, History, Philosophy & Theology, and ranking only second in Mathematics & Statistics, Biological sciences, Computer science, Economics & Econometrics, and Business & Management.

At the global level, University of Crete achieved a high rank (94th) on the most recent THE Young University Rankings. It was also 78th on the THE Emerging Economies University Rankings, ranked 36th for research impact. Notably, on the 2024 Quacquarelli Symonds (QS) World University Rankings University of Crete was ranked 168th for Citations per Faculty, while on the 2022-2023 Best Global Universities Rankings the university was ranked 145th for International Research Collaboration - relative to country. Equally important, on the 2023 THE Impact Rankings (against United Nations' Sustainable Development Goals (SDGs)), University of Crete was ranked 61st on SDG4 "Quality Education".

== Gallery ==
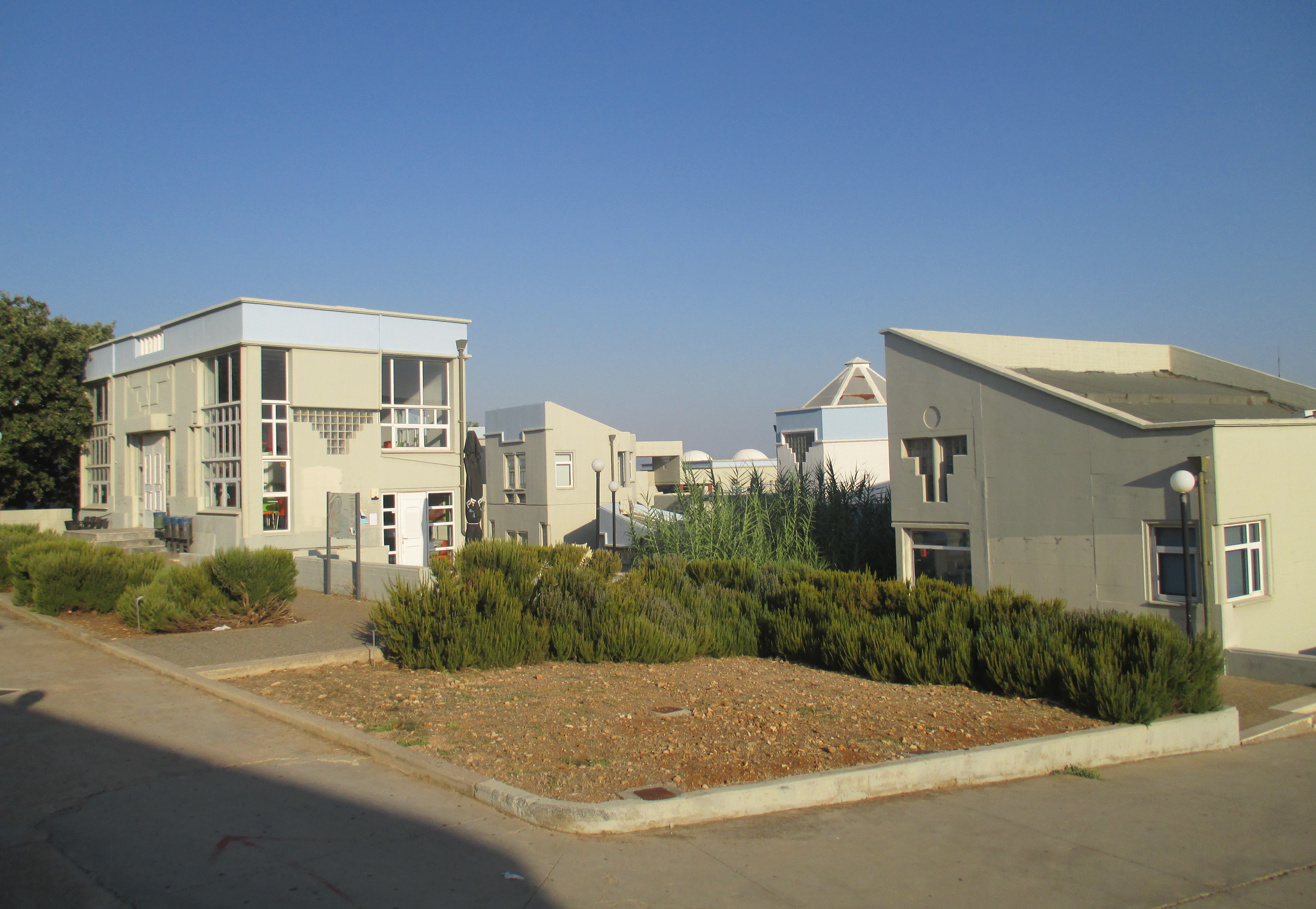

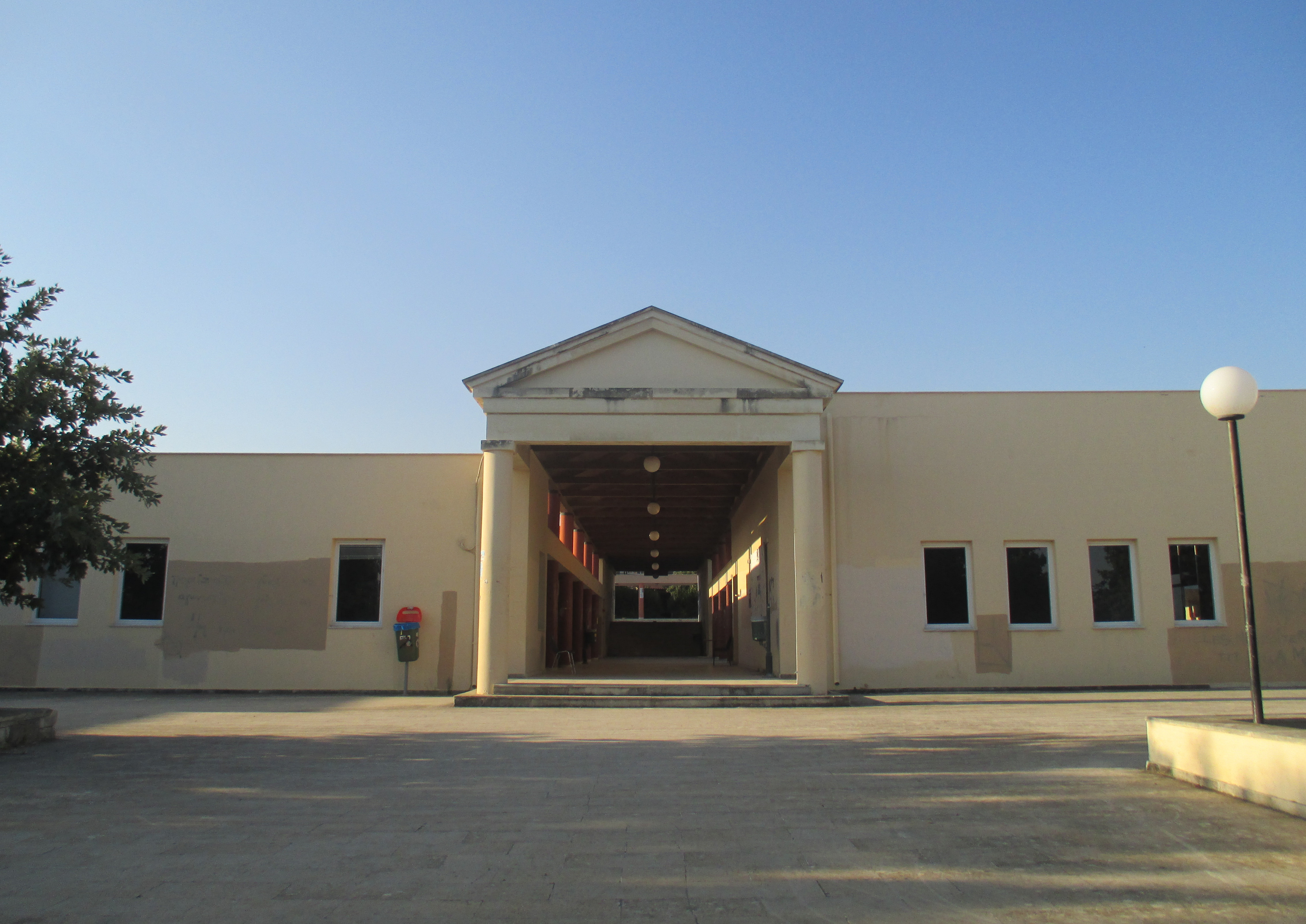

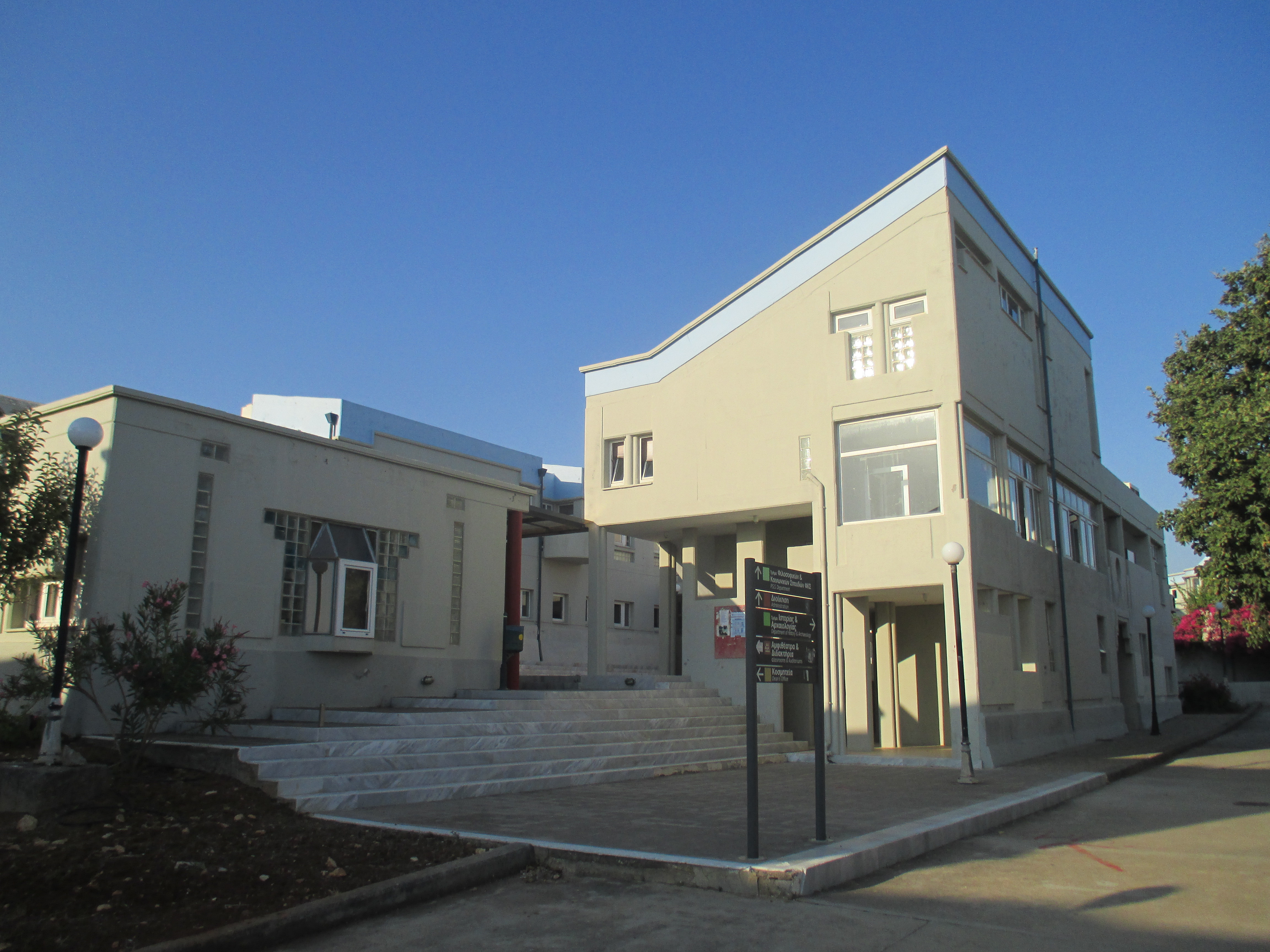

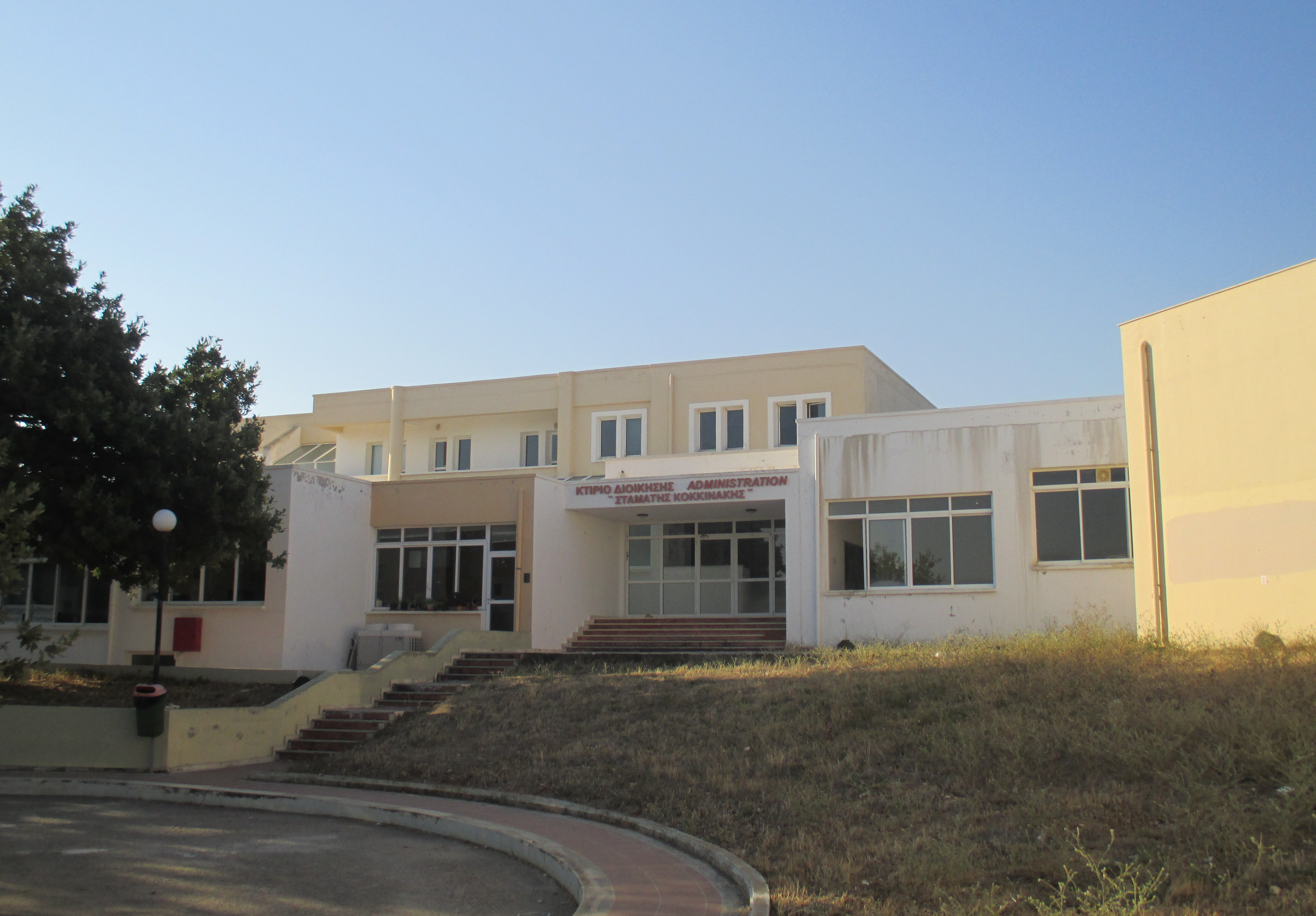

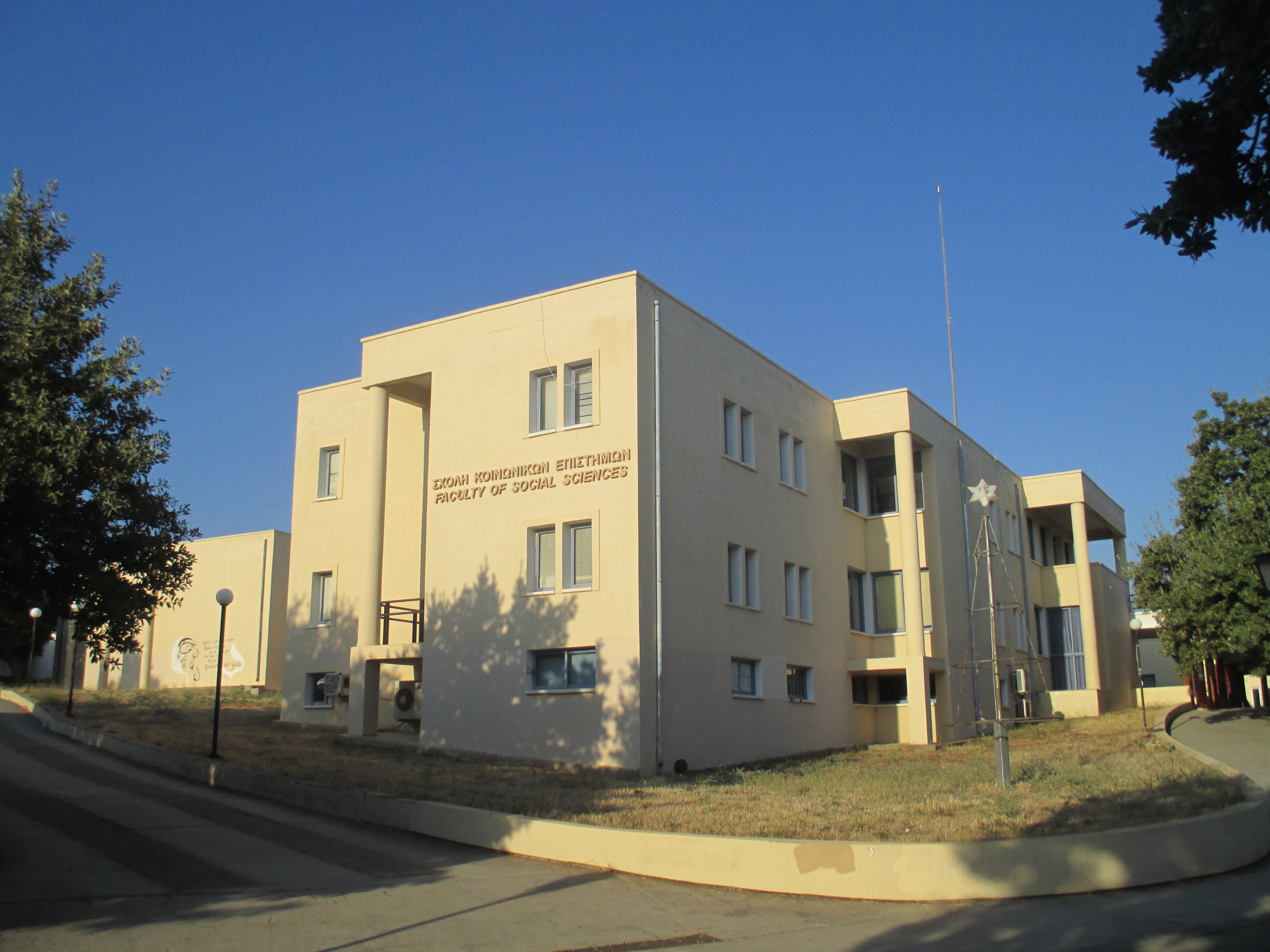

== See also ==
- Foundation for Research & Technology – Hellas
- List of universities in Greece
- Open access in Greece
- Technical University of Crete
