= Hereke =

- Neighbourhood
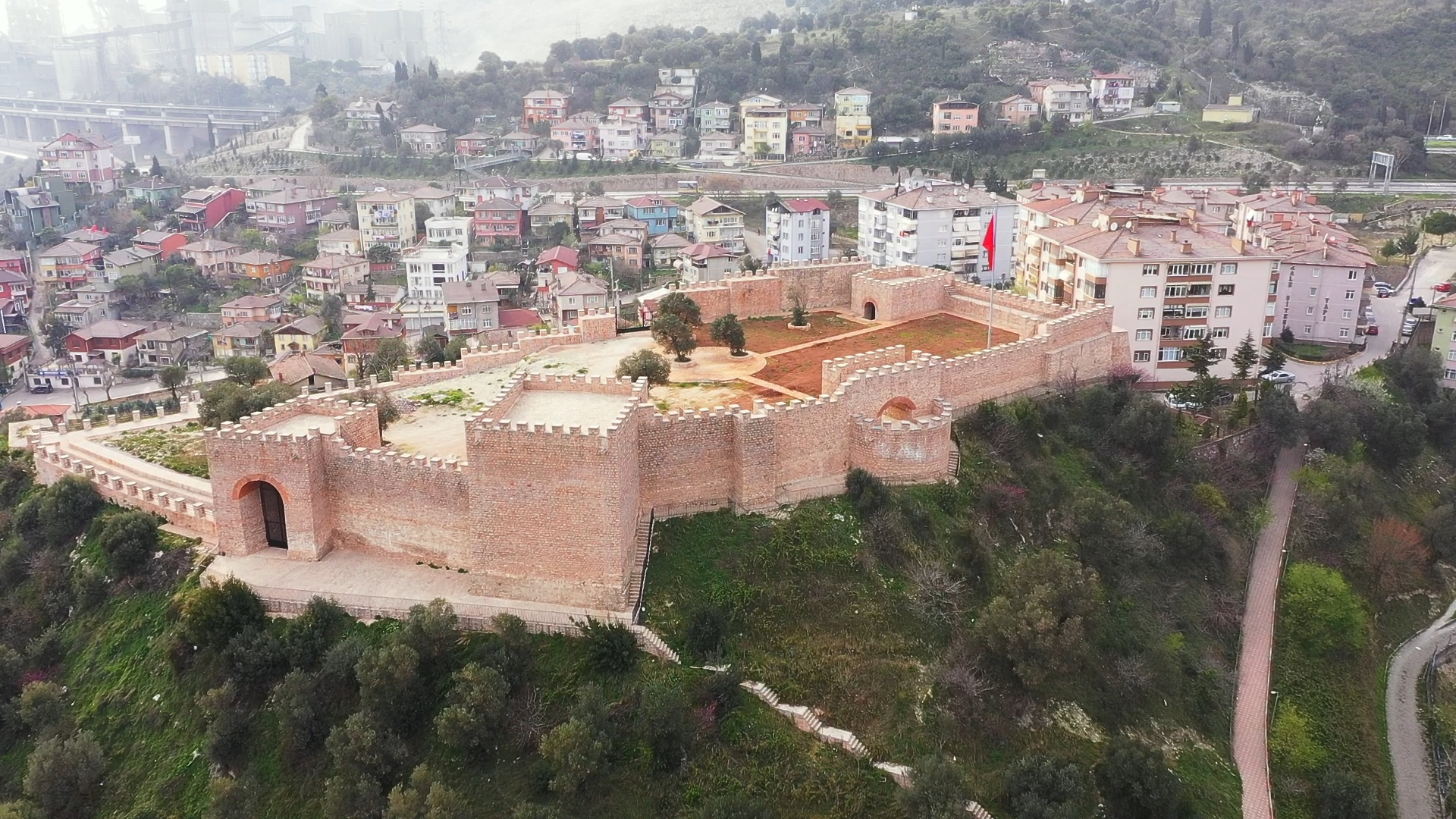
- Hereke castle

- Location within Turkey Location within Marmara
- Country: Turkey
- Province: Kocaeli
- District: Körfez
- Time zone: UTC+3 (TRT)

Located to the north of the Gulf of İzmit, near Istanbul. It is famous for Hereke carpets. It was bound to Gebze district until transferring to Körfez in 1987. It was an independent municipality until it was merged into the municipality of Körfez in 2008. It consists of 17 Ağustos (August 17), Agah Ateş, Cumhuriyet, Hacı Akif, Kışladüzü (formerly village), Şirinyalı (formerly village) and Yukarı Hereke mahalles. It can be reached by minibus (from Gebze and İzmit), public bus (from Darıca, Gebze and İzmit), Adapazarı Express train, ship and sea bus.

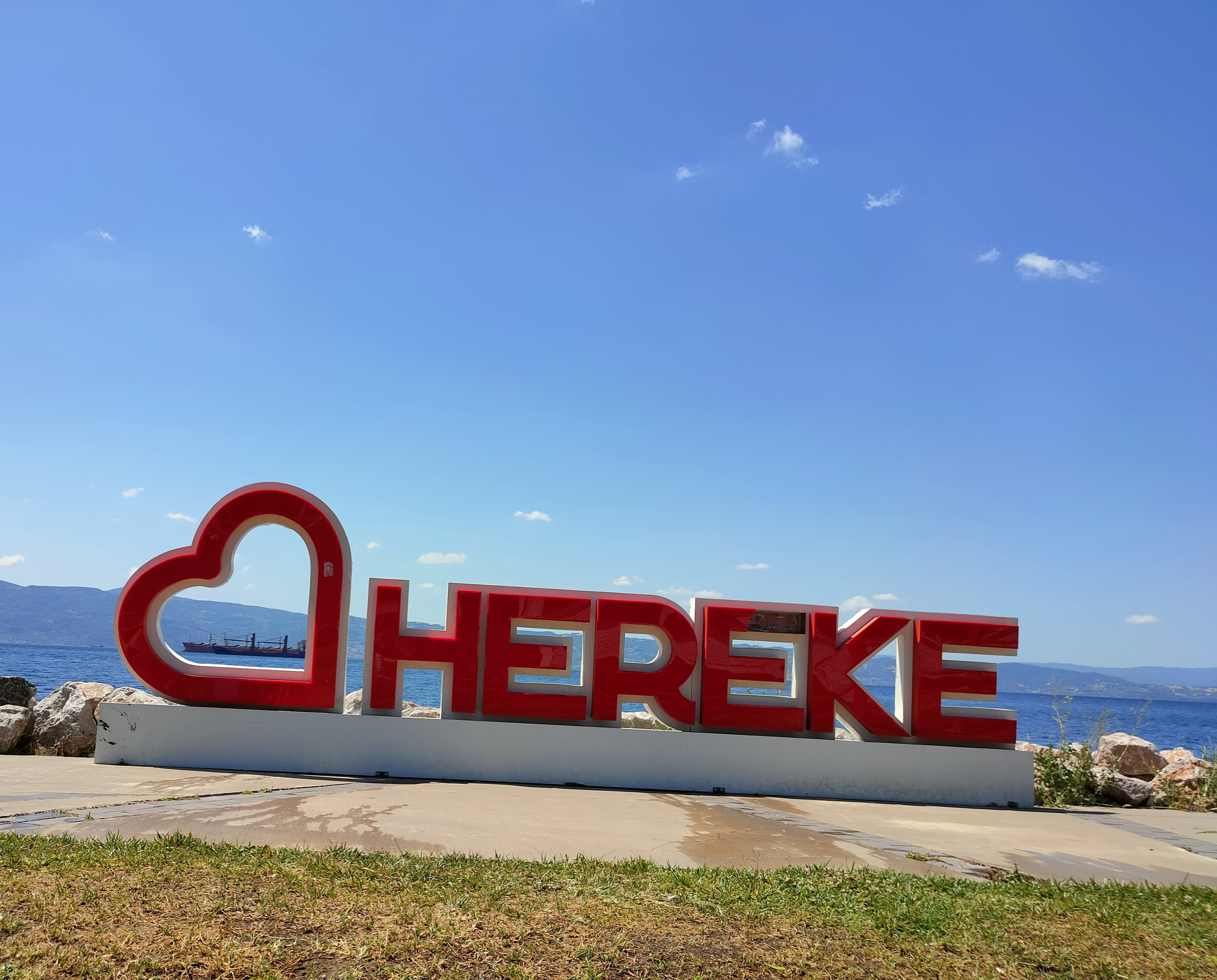
Hereke Sign in Kocaeli

== History ==
Hereke is a unique weaving center located at the northern edge of Izmit Bay, near Istanbul. The village of Hereke is recognized for producing fine hand knotted carpets. These special carpets represent the pinnacle of the Turkish carpet weaving tradition. Sultan Abdulmecid, Ottoman Emperor, established the Hereke Imperial Factory in 1843 to produce carpets, fabric, upholstery and curtains exclusively for the Ottoman Court.

As of 1920, Hereke was home to a carpet making school which was run by the state. Both Muslim and Christian women and children attended classes.

The establishment of the Hereke Imperial Factory by Sultan Abdulmecid coincided with the construction of Dolmabahçe Palace, in Istanbul. Sultan Abdulmecid asserted that the greatest palaces in the world should also display the finest carpets in the world. A workshop was established on the grounds of Dolmabahçe Palace and staffed with Hereke weavers. The Hereke Imperial Factory and Hereke workshop at Dolmabahçe produced the carpets that decorate the palace. Over 140 large carpets and 115 prayer rugs were produced, totaling more than 48,000 square feet (4,500 m^{2}).

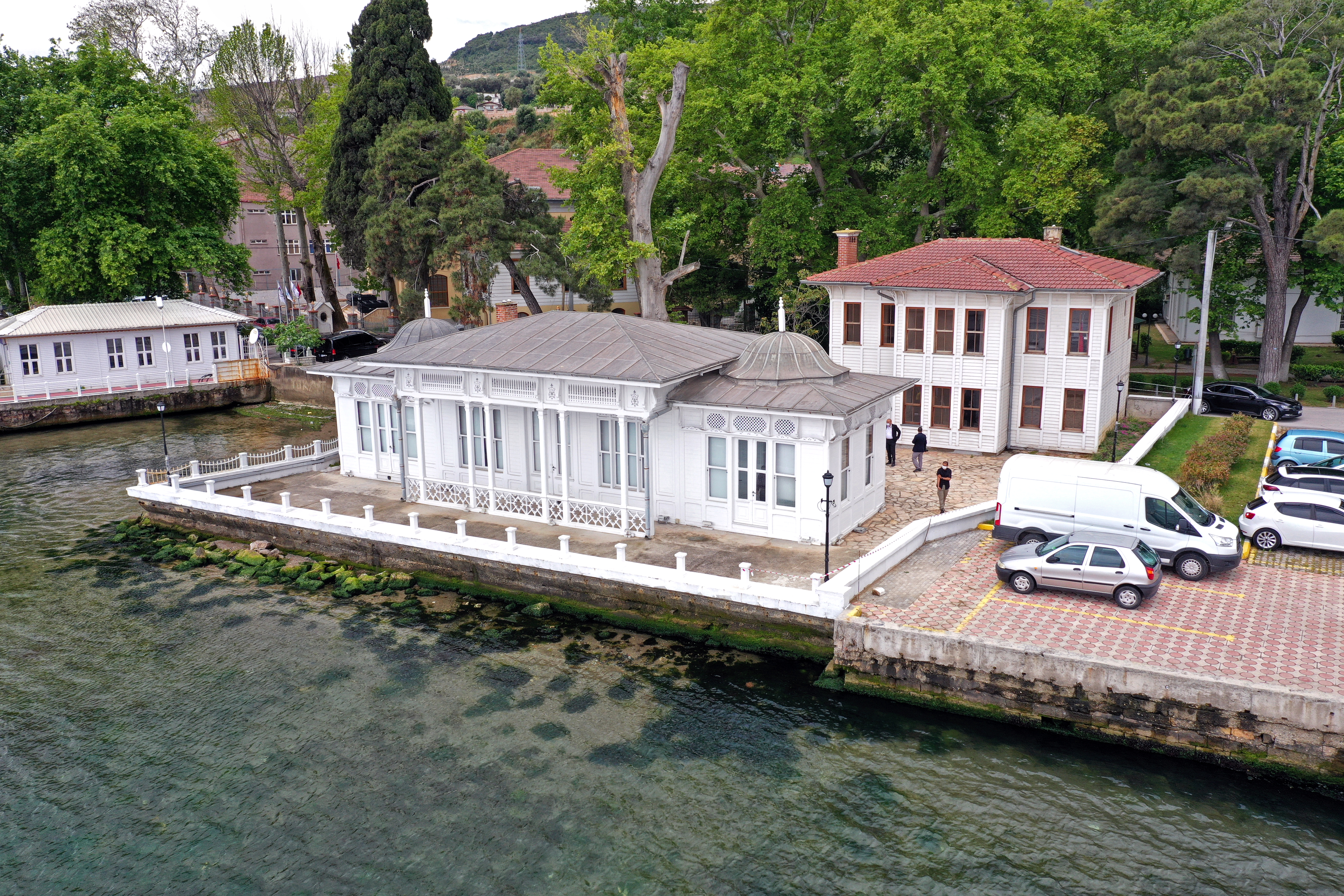
Hereke Wilhelem Köşkü (Mansion)

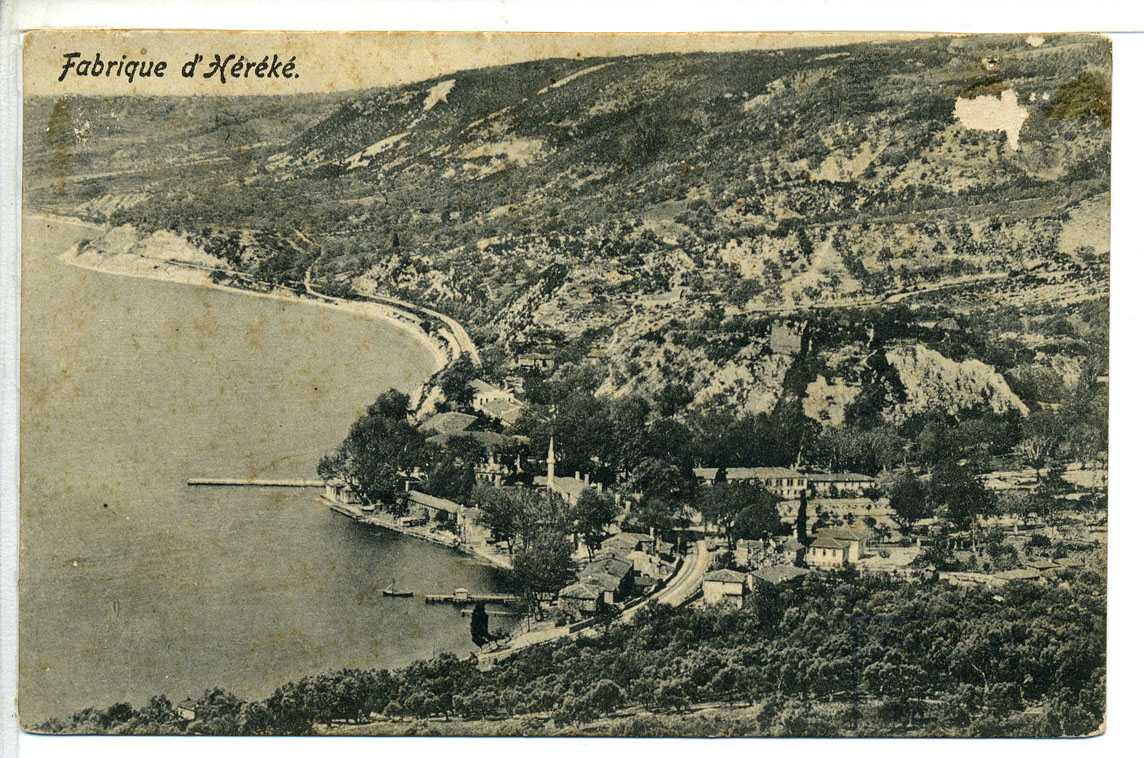
An old postcard for Hereke Factory

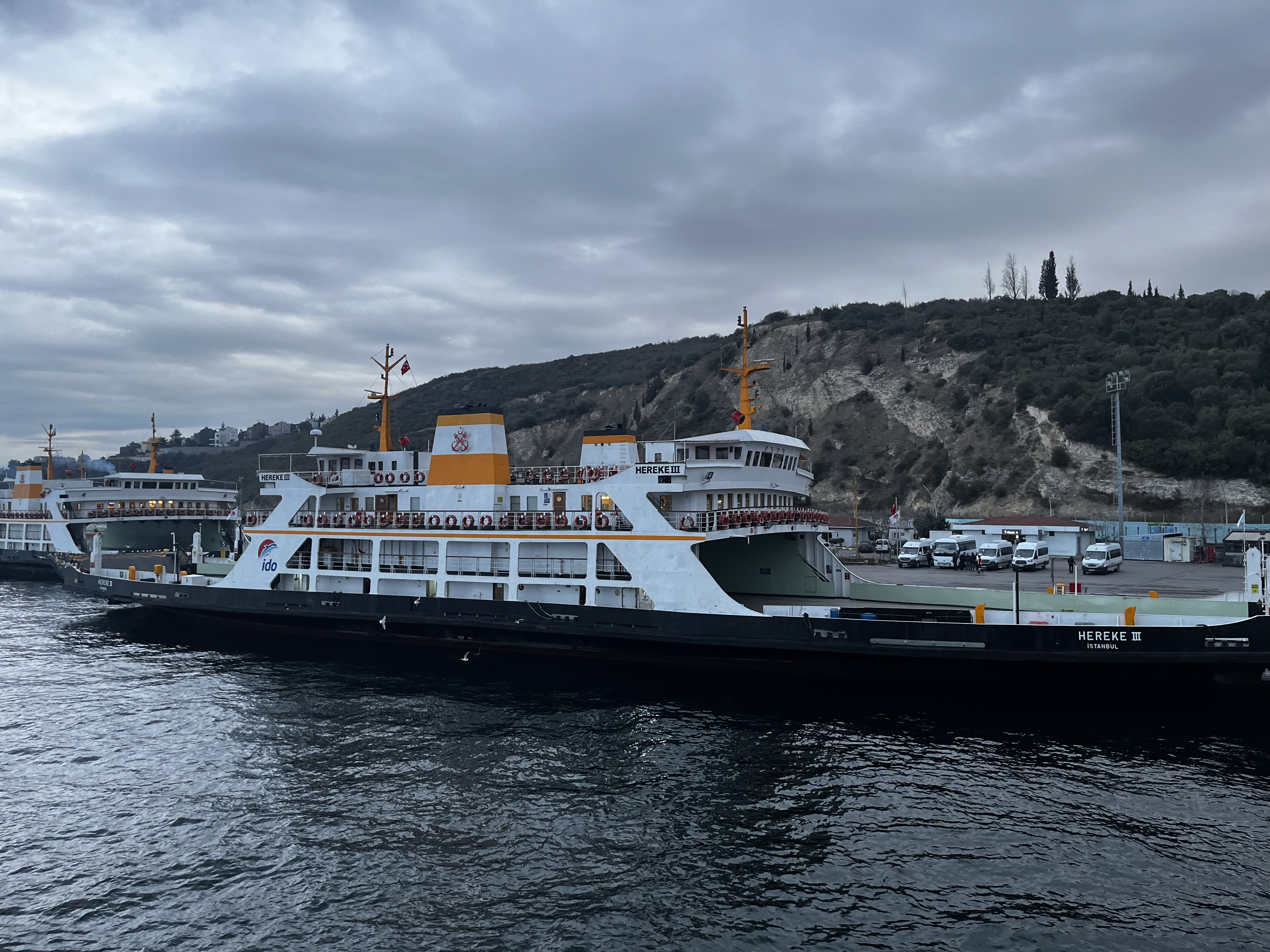
Hereke III (ship, 1986)

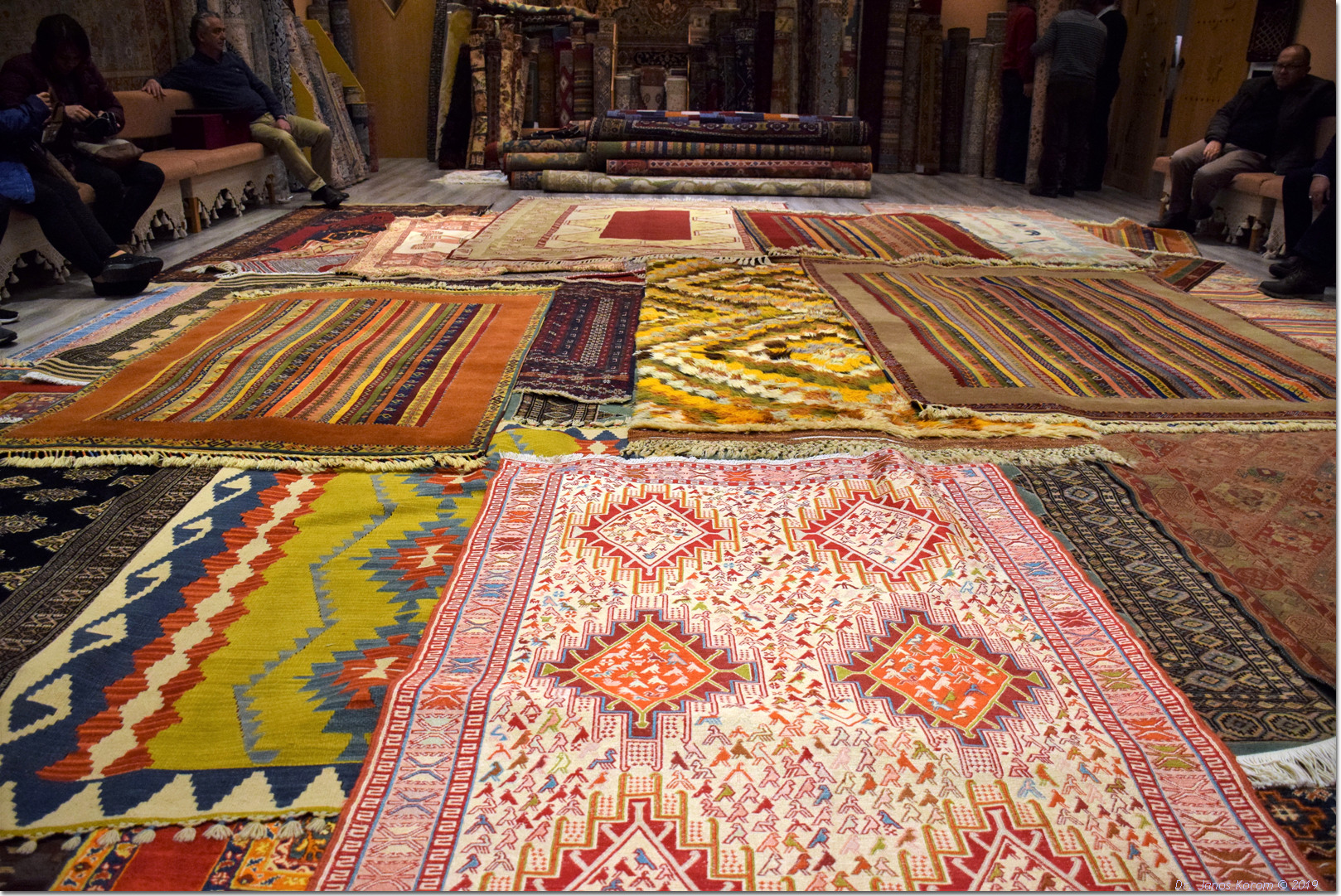
Hereke is known for its rugs

Hereke designs were not only inspired by the motifs and compositions of traditional Turkish carpets, but also by the more elaborate curvilinear motifs of Persia and Mameluke Egypt. Many designs reflected contemporary Western European tastes. The Usak medallion composition, used in Turkish rugs since the 16th century, was widely used at the Hereke factory. The intricacy of the designs and the sheer volume of knots needed made the construction of Hereke rugs a very lengthy process. The superlative quality of Hereke carpets was realized by combining the best carpet making techniques available, thus creating a new archetype.

Hereke production was interrupted in 1878, when the factory burned to the ground, however, the Imperial Factory was rebuilt in 1882. During the late 19th and early 20th century, Hereke weavers produced their unique craft exclusively for the aristocracy of the Ottoman Empire, visiting dignitaries and heads of state. Fine Hereke hand knotted carpets were presented as gifts to the royal families of Japan, Russia, Germany and England. Demand steadily increased as Hereke carpets gained acclaim throughout Europe. As production increased, Hereke carpets became available in the markets of Istanbul. Hereke carpets received many prizes and medals for their outstanding quality. Vienna (1892), Lyon (1894), Bursa (1907), Vienna (1908), Brussels (1910 and 1911), Bursa (1911), Turin (1911), and Izmir (1921)

== Technique ==
Hereke carpets are manufactured using a unique construction method. The initial preparation of the loom is distinct from most other techniques worldwide. The Hereke method allows the possibility of a second weft, this difference separates the Hereke carpet-making technique from others. Hereke carpets are double knotted using the Turkish knot, resulting in a more durable product. Double knots cannot be undone or removed, unlike single knots. Hereke silk carpets have 1 million and over knots per square meter.
