= Hereke carpet =

Turkish carpet

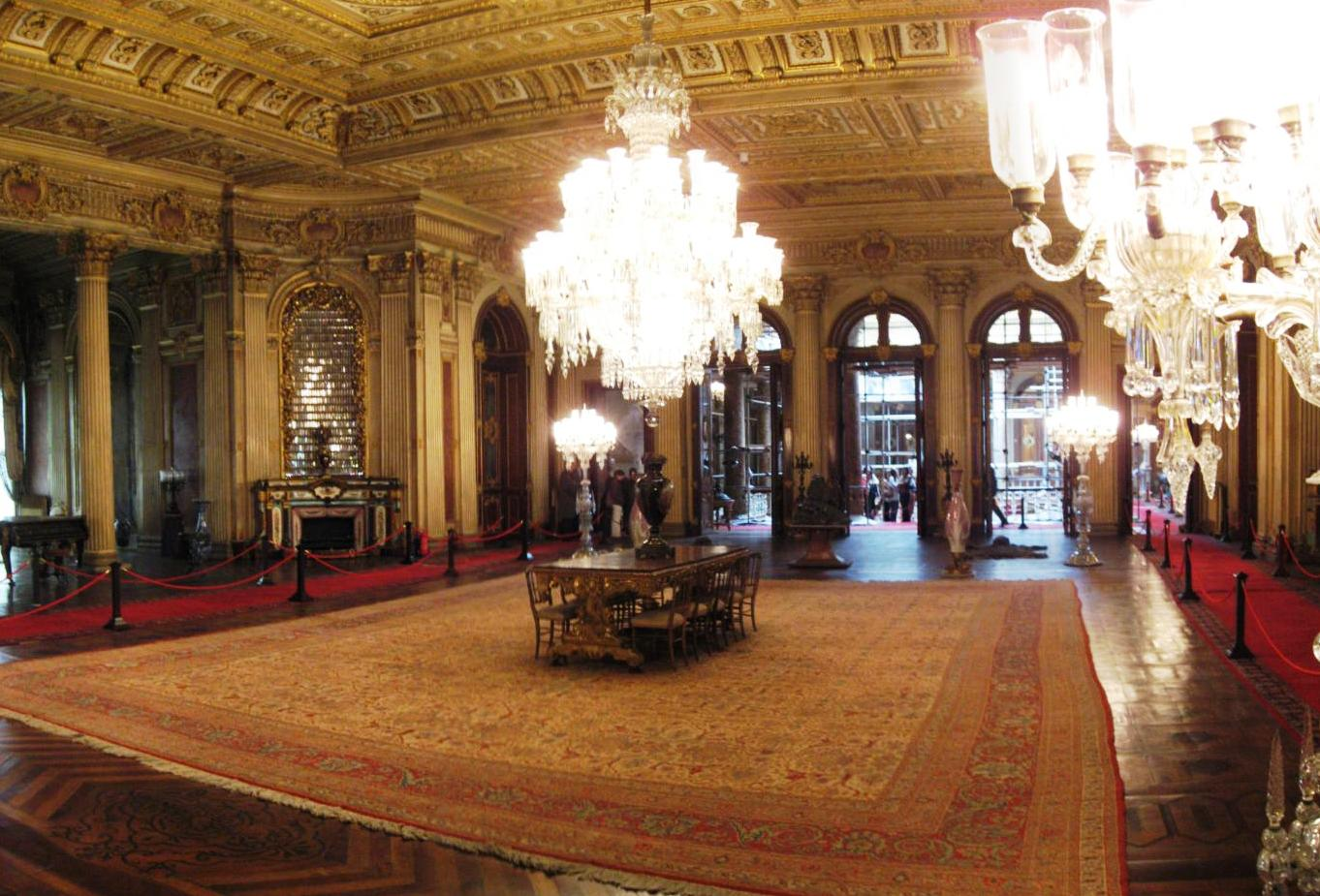
The Hereke carpet in the Ambassador's Hall in Dolmabahçe Palace is about 120m² large

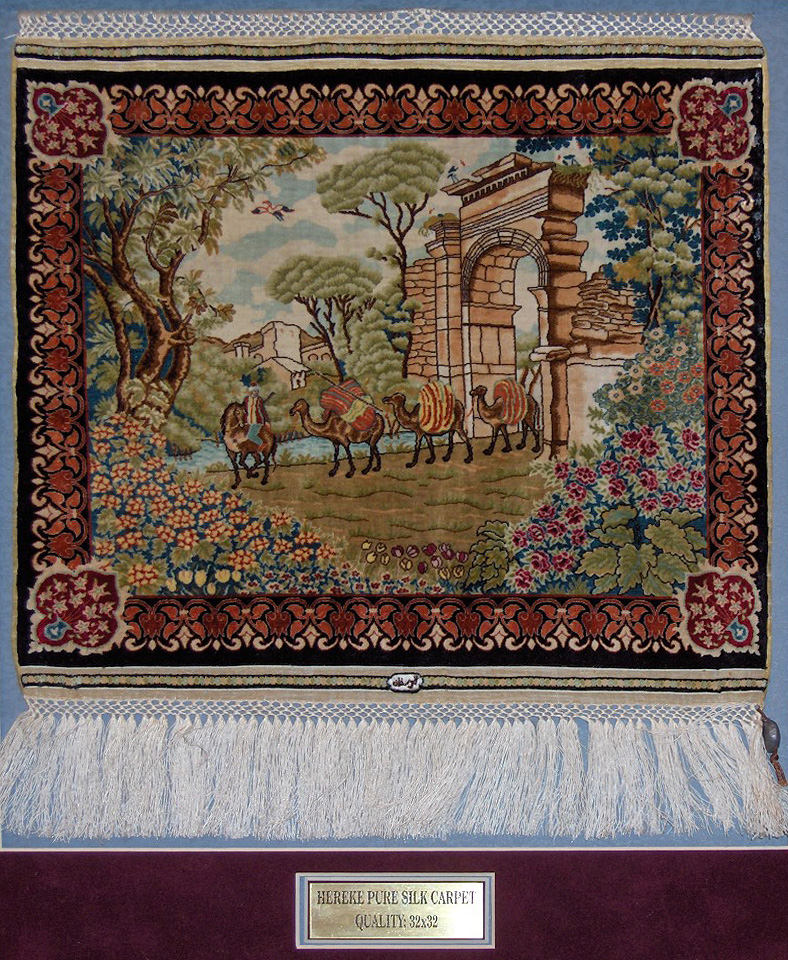
Silk on silk Hereke carpet 0.6 m2, 32 x 32 knots/cm2; 13 years of work

Hereke carpets are Turkish handmade carpets produced and sold in Hereke, a coastal town in Turkey. For a long time, they were produced only in Hereke, 60 km from Istanbul. The materials used are silk, a combination of wool and cotton, and sometimes gold or silver threads.

The Ottoman sultan Abdülmecid I founded the Hereke Imperial Manufacture in 1841 to produce all the textiles for his Dolmabahçe Palace on the Bosphorus. He gathered the best artists and carpet weavers of the Ottoman Empire in Hereke, where they began producing high-quality rugs and large carpets with unique patterns.

After completing work on the Dolmabahçe Palace, the Ottoman sultans used to give Hereke carpets as gifts to selected visiting royalty, noblemen and statesmen. It was not until 1890 that some traders in Istanbul were allowed to sell some of the pieces made at Hereke. With the end of the Ottoman Empire, the production of Hereke carpets was restricted until the middle of the 20th century, when some master-weavers in Hereke began once more to produce the carpets in continuation of the tradition of the Ottoman palace carpets.

As of 1920, Hereke was home to a carpet-making school which was run by the state. Both Muslim and Christian women and children attended classes.

Hereke carpets typically are very large, palace-sized carpets, and they are made with wool on cotton, camel hair on cotton, silk on cotton, as well as silk on silk, which are knotted in small sizes. The precision of their double knots (Turkish or Ghiordes knots), which allows the clear display of patterns, together with the colour combinations and the harmonious patterns, have made them highly collectible. Today, Hereke carpets and rugs are still made with the traditional patterns of the Ottoman sultan, Abdülmecid I, as well as both traditional Anatolian and contemporary figurative patterns.

== Manufacturing information ==
The Hereke carpet is woven in two ways: wool on cotton yarn and silk on silk. There are 3600 loops per dm² of wool carpets. Its quality is called 60x60. In silk carpets, there are 10.000 loops per dm². Its quality is called 100x100. This is the standard of real Hereke carpets, even though they are woven more often.

Pile heights are 1.5-2.0 mm for silk carpets and 4.0-5.0 mm for wool carpets. Since Hereke carpets are frequently woven, the patterns are quite detailed. Hereke carpets are geographically registered with patents. Since Hereke carpets are woven with a Turkish knot (called a double knot or Gördes knot), they are much more durable than Persian rugs (single knot or sini knot). Hereke carpets have come to life with the original designs of the palace engravers, which have not been affected by the Iranian carpet patterns until today, even when they were first woven. Unfortunately, the wool quality used today is much lower than the wool quality used in carpets in the past.

The reason for this is that while the wool used was completely live animal wool in the past, nowadays cut animal wool is used, moreover, the wool used has a duller color than the old ones due to the dye quality and non-compliance with the shearing seasons. But today, especially the wool produced by Sümerhalı is given a mothproof property with a special finish before the fleece is dyed. Paint is done later. This increases the durability and quality of the carpet. Apart from this, it is woven in Isparta region, Sivas (Sivas Prison carpet is also a hereke carpet) and Diyarbakır. The carpets woven on these looms are trimmed at appropriate height in special pile machines in the Isparta Sümer carpet factory, washed, their backs are cleaned from excess lengths with flame and classified according to their quality and released to the market. When buying a Hereke carpet, care should be taken that the wool does not gush out from weft and warp on the back, and the pattern does not slip. In addition, the pile height and the cut shape also affect the quality.

The most known and classic pattern of this carpet is "The Flower of Seven Mountains". However, there are also very beautiful patterns such as burucie and polonez. If we compare the Hereke carpet with the Persian carpets, the thousands of dollars' worth of Bidjar rugs can be considered as a precedent even if not as much as hereke. However, the way of weaving, pattern and color variety, and being a hard carpet always highlight the Hereke carpet.

== Bibliography ==
- Oktay Aslanapa, Ayşe Fazlıoğlu. The Last Loop of the Knot; Ottoman Court Carpets. TBMM, Istanbul, 2006.
- Uğur Ayyıldız. Hereke and Kayseri: Pure silk Turkish carpets. NET Turizm Ticaret ve Sanayi A.S (1983). ASIN B0007B1NHG
