= Dolmabahçe Palace =

Palace in Istanbul, Turkey

- Dolmabahçe Sarayı
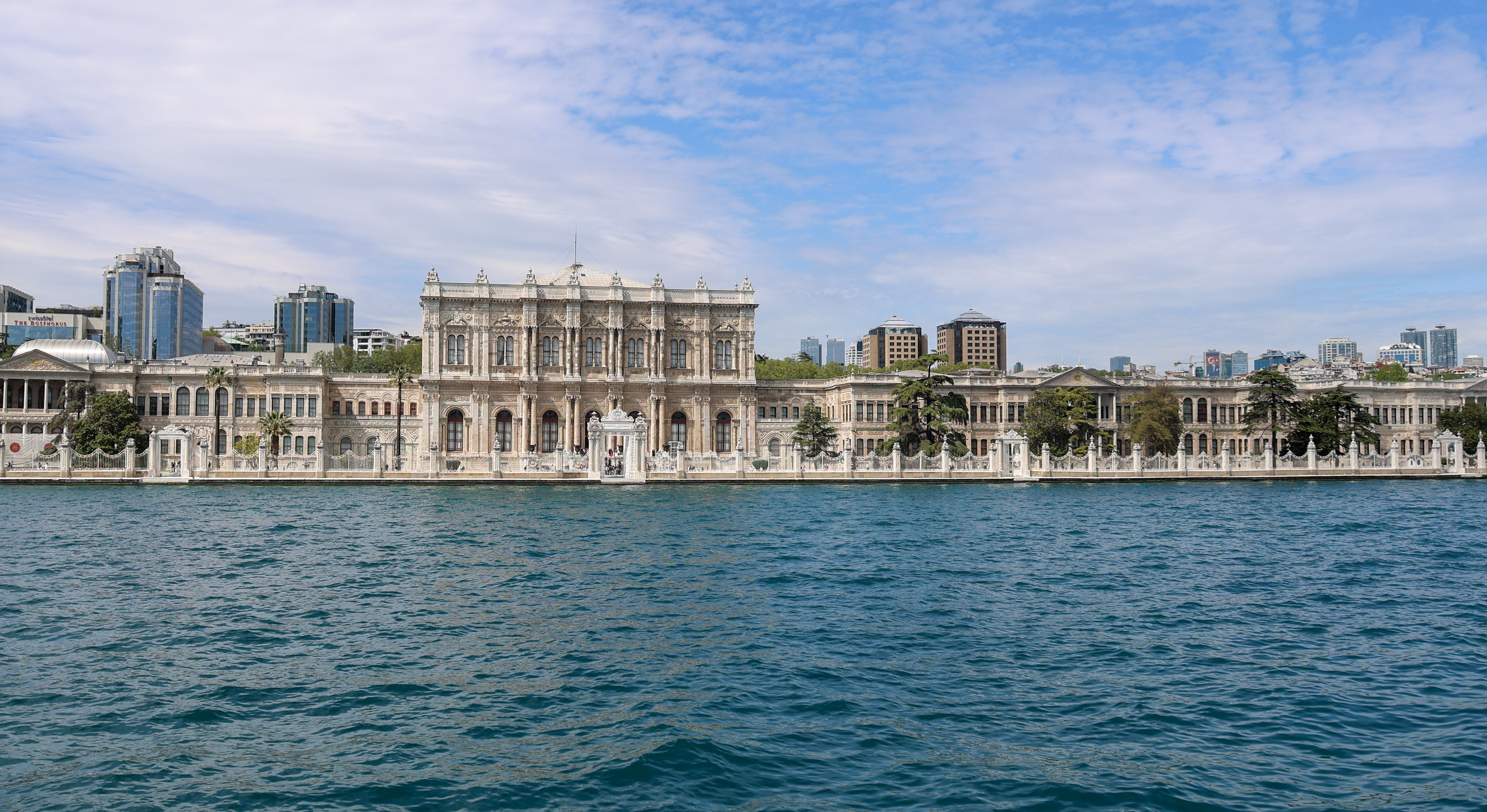
- A view of Dolmabahçe Palace from the Bosporus
- Interactive map of the Dolmabahçe Palace area

General information
- Type: Palace (1853–1984)
- Architectural style: Baroque Revival and Rococo Revival
- Location: Istanbul, Turkey
- Coordinates: 41°02′22″N 29°00′06″E
- Construction started: 1843
- Completed: 1853
- Client: Ottoman sultans
- Owner: Government of Turkey

Design and construction
- Architect: Garabet Balyan

Website
- www.millisaraylar.gov.tr

Dolmabahçe Palace (Turkish: Dolmabahçe Sarayı [doɫˈmabahtʃe saɾaˈjɯ]) is a 19th-century imperial palace located in Istanbul, Turkey, along the European shore of the Bosporus, which served as the main administrative center of the Ottoman Empire from 1853 to 1887 and from 1909 to 1922.

== History ==
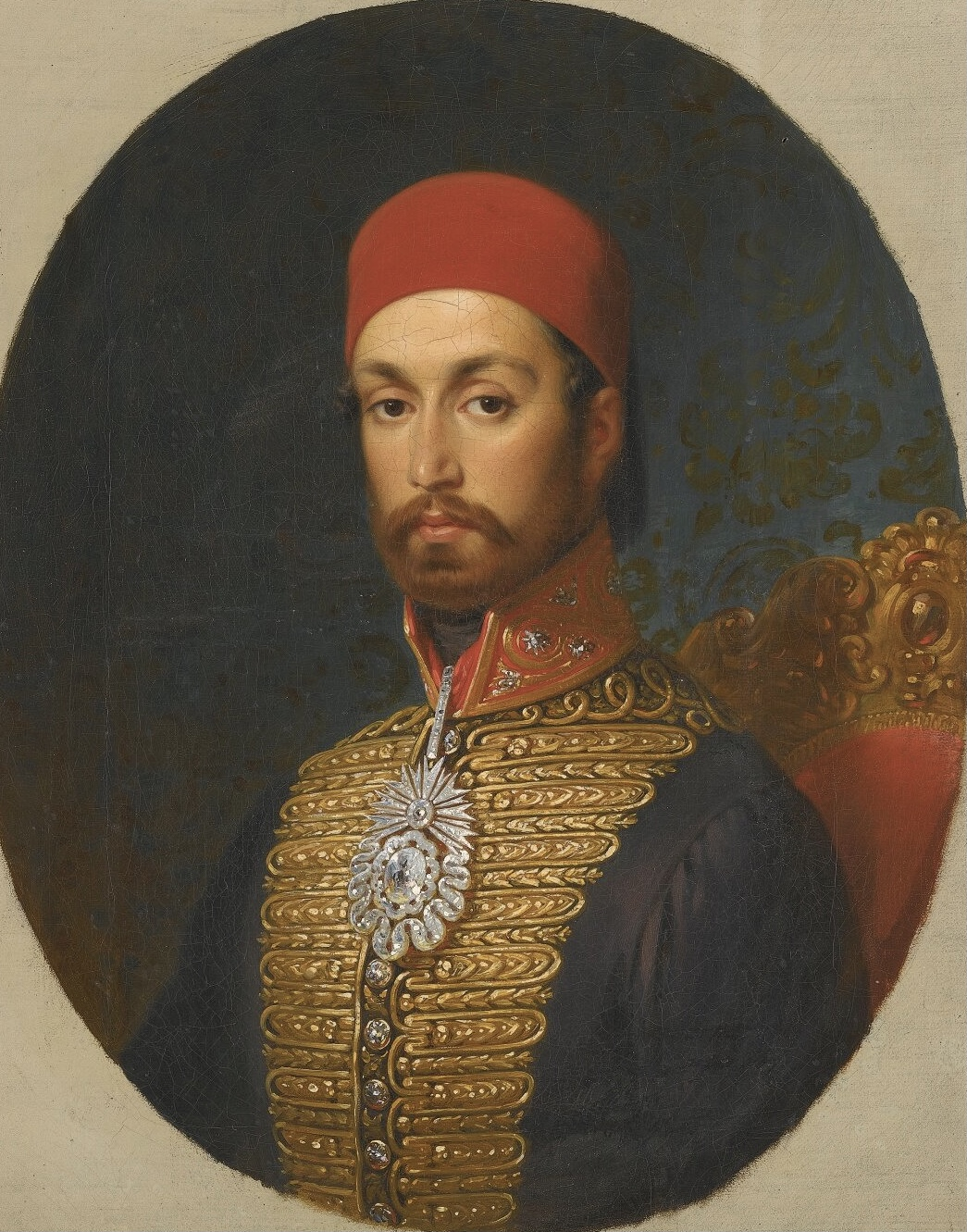
Abdülmecid I

Dolmabahçe Palace was ordered by the empire's 31st sultan, Abdülmecid I, and built between the years 1843 and 1853. Previously, the sultan and his family had lived at the Topkapı Palace, but as the medieval Topkapı was lacking in contemporary style, luxury, and comfort, as compared to the palaces of the European monarchs, Abdülmecid decided to build a new modern palace near the site of the former Beşiktaş Sahil Palace, which was demolished. Hacı Said Ağa was responsible for the construction works, while the project was realized by architects Garabet Balyan, his son Nigoğayos Balyan and Evanis Kalfa (members of the Armenian Balyan family of Ottoman court architects).

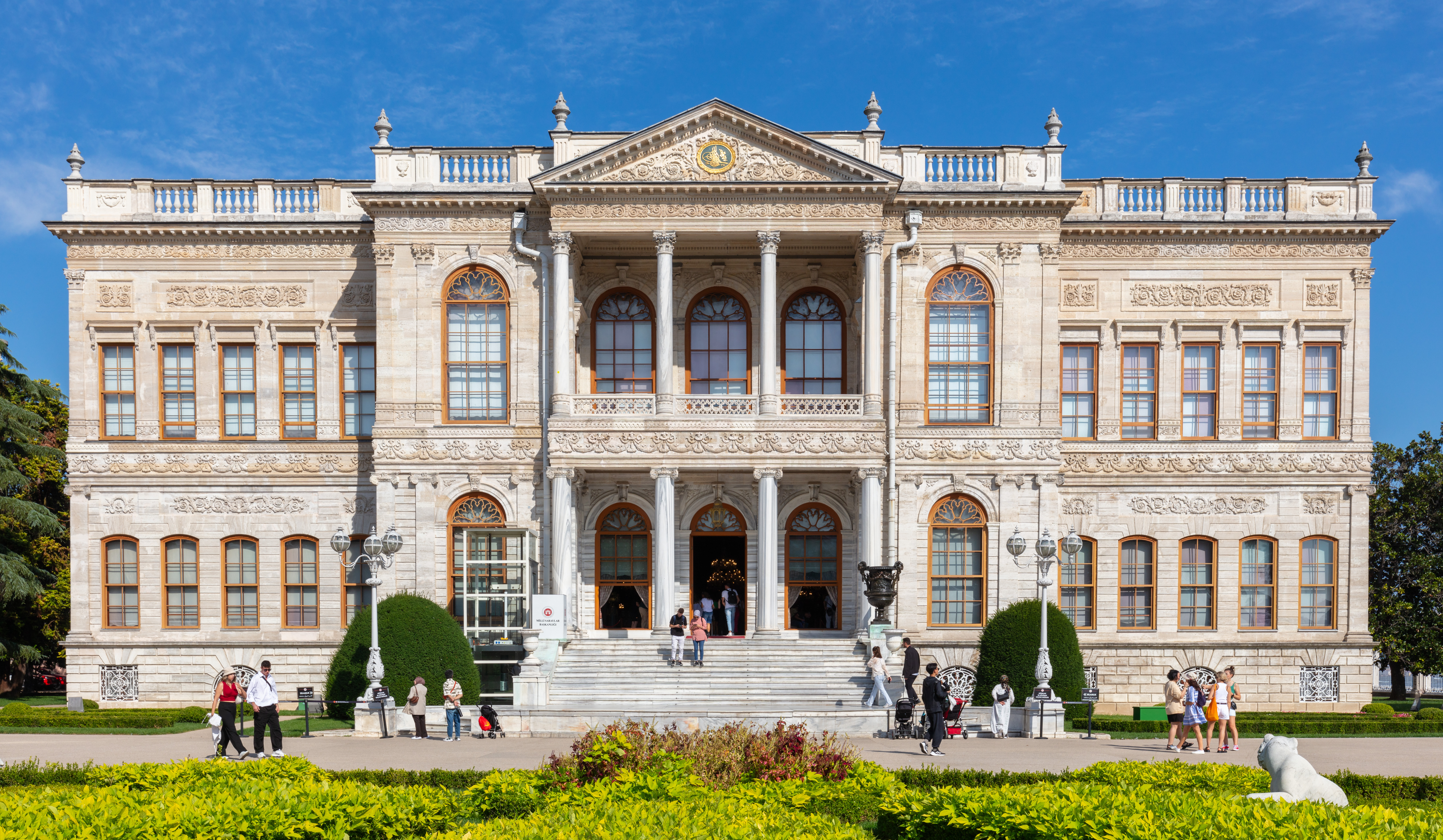
Façade of the Selamlık

As of May 29, 2025, the construction cost the equivalent of ca. US$3 billion: five million Ottoman lira, or 35 tonnes of gold. This sum corresponded to approximately a quarter of the yearly tax revenue. The construction was financed through debasement, by massive issue of paper money, as well as by foreign loans. The huge expenses placed an enormous burden on the state purse and contributed to the deteriorating financial situation of the Ottoman Empire, which eventually defaulted on its public debt in October 1875, with the subsequent establishment in 1881 of the Ottoman Public Debt Administration (OPDA) for financial control over the "sick man of Europe" by the European powers.

The palace was home to six sultans from 1853, when it was first inhabited, up until the abolition of the Caliphate in 1924: The last royal to live here was Caliph Abdülmecid II. A law that took effect on March 3, 1924 transferred ownership of the palace to the national heritage of the new Turkish Republic. Mustafa Kemal Atatürk, the founder and first President of the Republic of Turkey, used the palace as a presidential residence during the summers and enacted some of his most important works here. Atatürk spent the last days of his medical treatment in this palace, where he died on November 10, 1938.

Today, the palace is managed by Milli Saraylar Daire Başkanlığı (Directorate of National Palaces) responsible to the Grand National Assembly of Turkey.

== Location ==
The site of Dolmabahçe was originally a bay on the Bosporus which was used for the anchorage of the Ottoman fleet. The area was reclaimed gradually during the 18th century to become an imperial garden, much appreciated by the Ottoman sultans; it is from this garden that the name Dolmabahçe comes from طولمه dolma "filled (in)" and باغچه bahçe "garden" in Persian. Various small summer palaces and wooden pavilions were constructed here during the 18th and 19th centuries, ultimately forming the Beşiktaş Waterfront Palace complex. The area of 110,000 m^{2} is confined by Bosporus on the east side, while a steep precipice bounds it on the west side, such that after the building of the new 45,000 metres (147,637.80 ft) monoblock Dolmabahçe Palace a relatively limited space has remained for a garden complex which would normally surround such a palace.

== Design and layout ==
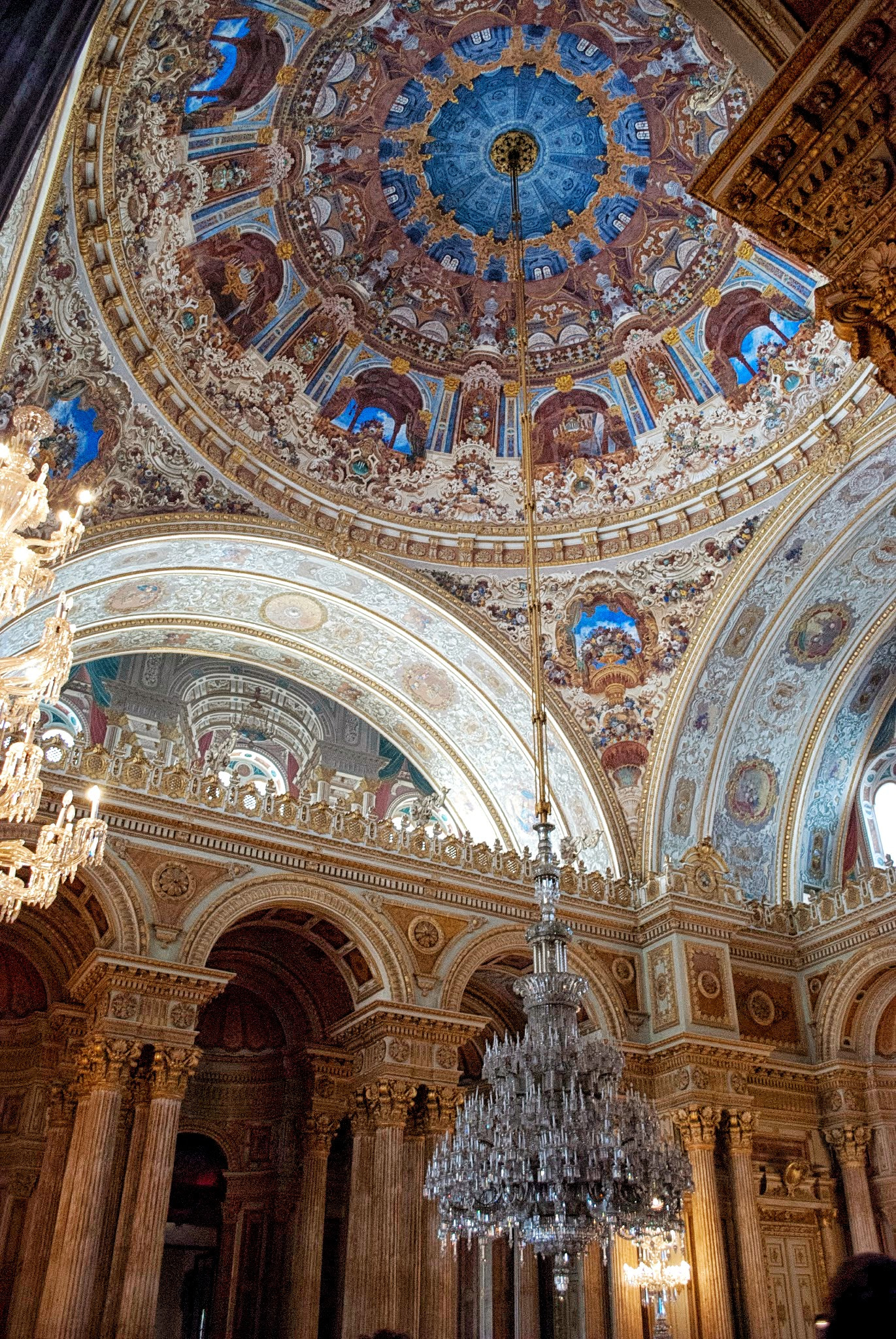
The Ceremonial Hall with the world's largest crystal chandelier, previously believed to have been a gift from Queen Victoria.

Dolmabahçe is the largest palace in Turkey. It has an area of 45,000 m^{2} (480,000 sq ft), and contains 285 rooms, 46 halls, six hammams, and 68 toilets.

The design contains eclectic elements from the Baroque, Rococo and Neoclassical styles, blended with traditional Ottoman architecture to create a new synthesis. The palace layout and décor reflect the increasing influence of European styles and standards on Ottoman culture and art during the Tanzimat. The exterior, in particular the view from the Bosporus, shows a classical European two-wing arrangement which is divided by a big avant-corps with two side avant-corps.

Floor plan of the palace

Functionally, on the other hand, the palace retains elements of traditional Ottoman palace life, and also features of traditional Turkish homes. It is strictly separated structurally in a southern wing (Mabeyn-i Hümâyûn, or selamlık (andron) "quarters reserved for men", which contains the public representation rooms, and a northern wing (Harem-i Hümâyûn, the Ottoman Imperial Harem), serving as the harem (gynaeceum) or private residential area for the sultan and his family. The two functional areas are separated by the big Ceremonial Hall (Muayede Salonu) with a floor area of 2,000 m^{2} (22,000 ft^{2}) and a 36 m (118 ft) high dome. Since the harem had to be completely isolated from the outside world, the main entrance for the visitors is located on the narrow southern side. There, the reception rooms are arranged for the reception of visitors and foreign diplomats. The harem area comprises eight interconnected apartments, each with a bathroom, for the wives, favourites, and concubines of the sultan, as well as the Valide sultan, his mother.

== Décor and equipment ==
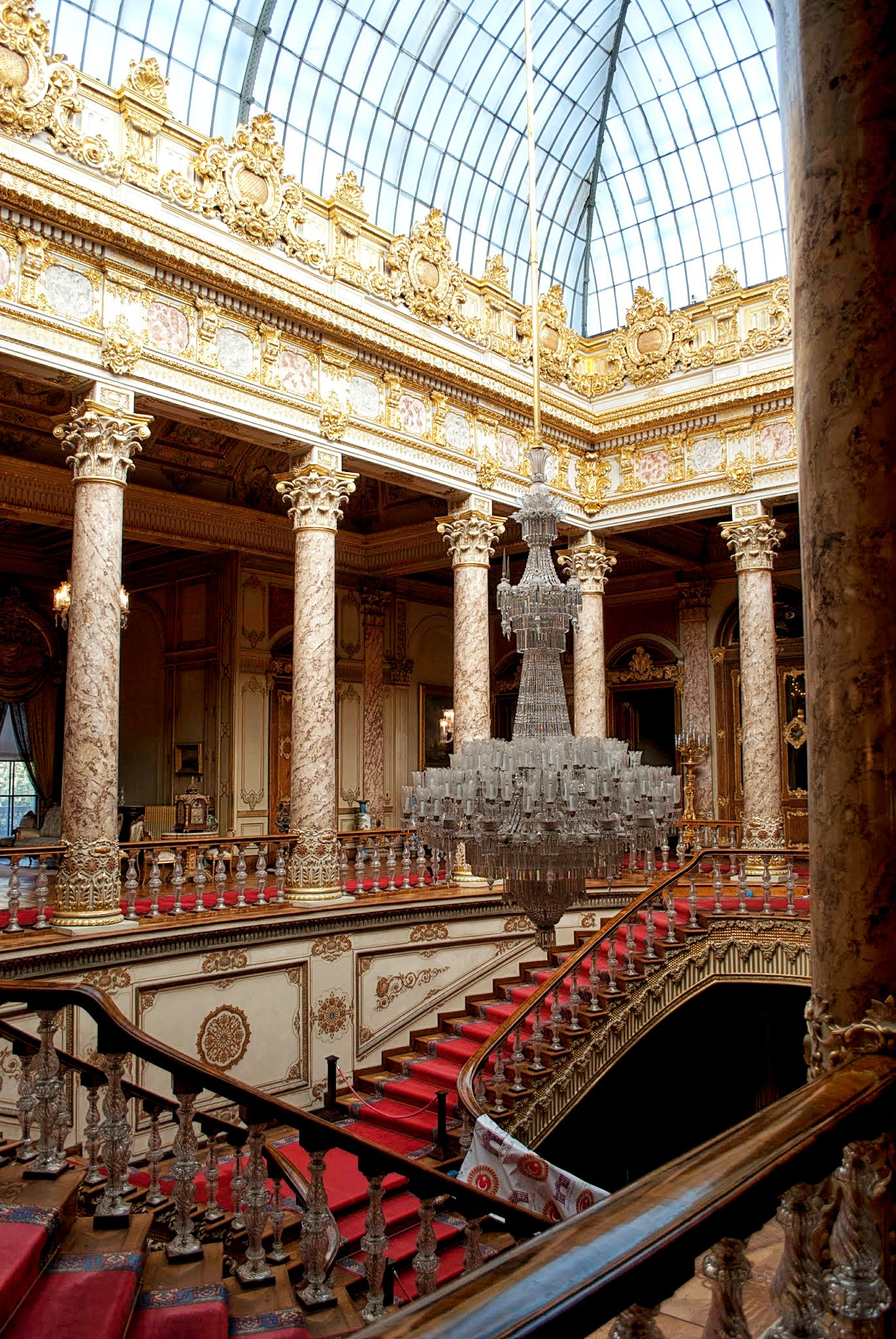
Crystal Staircase with Baccarat crystal banisters and chandelier

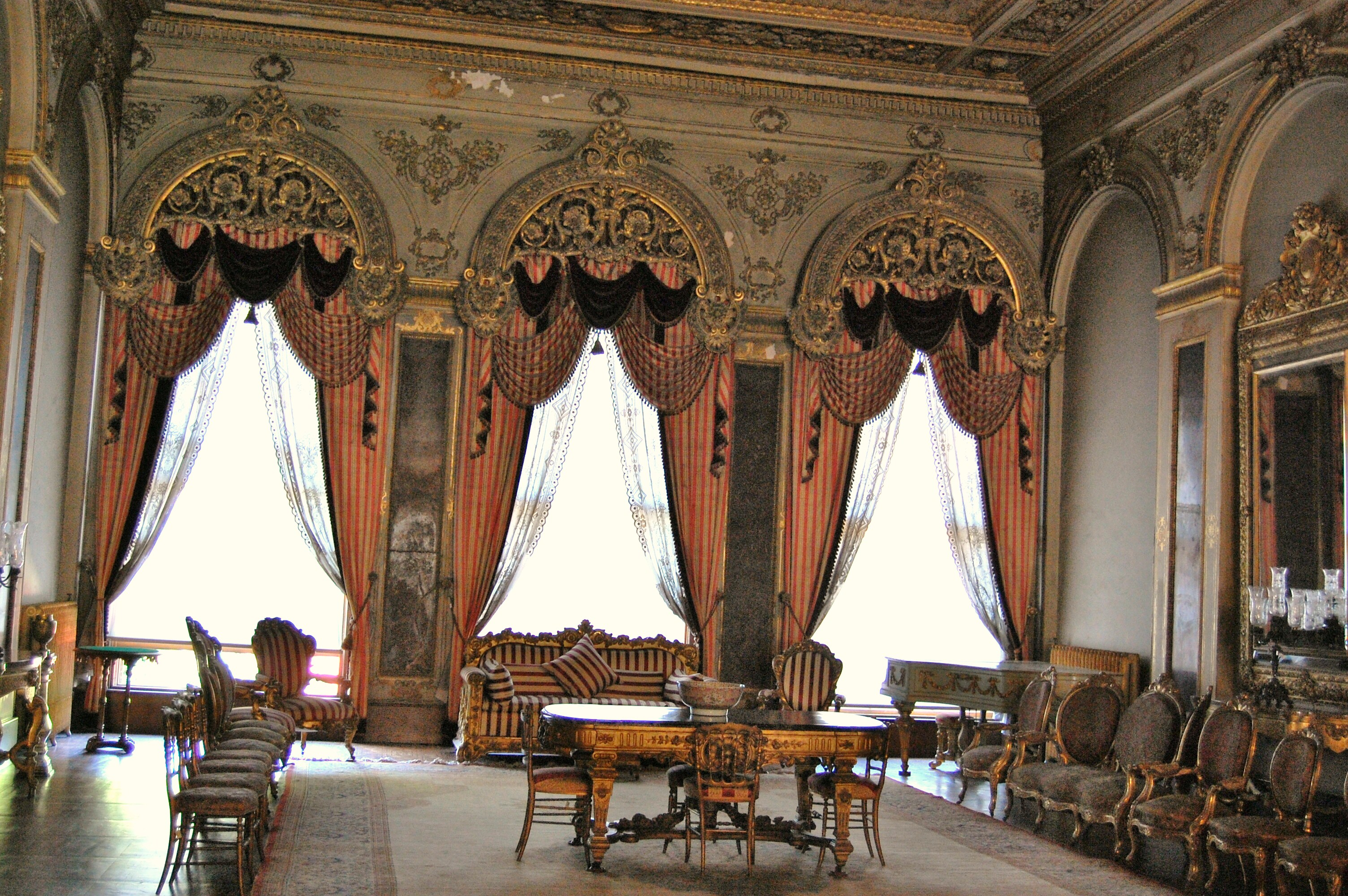
Entrance Hall

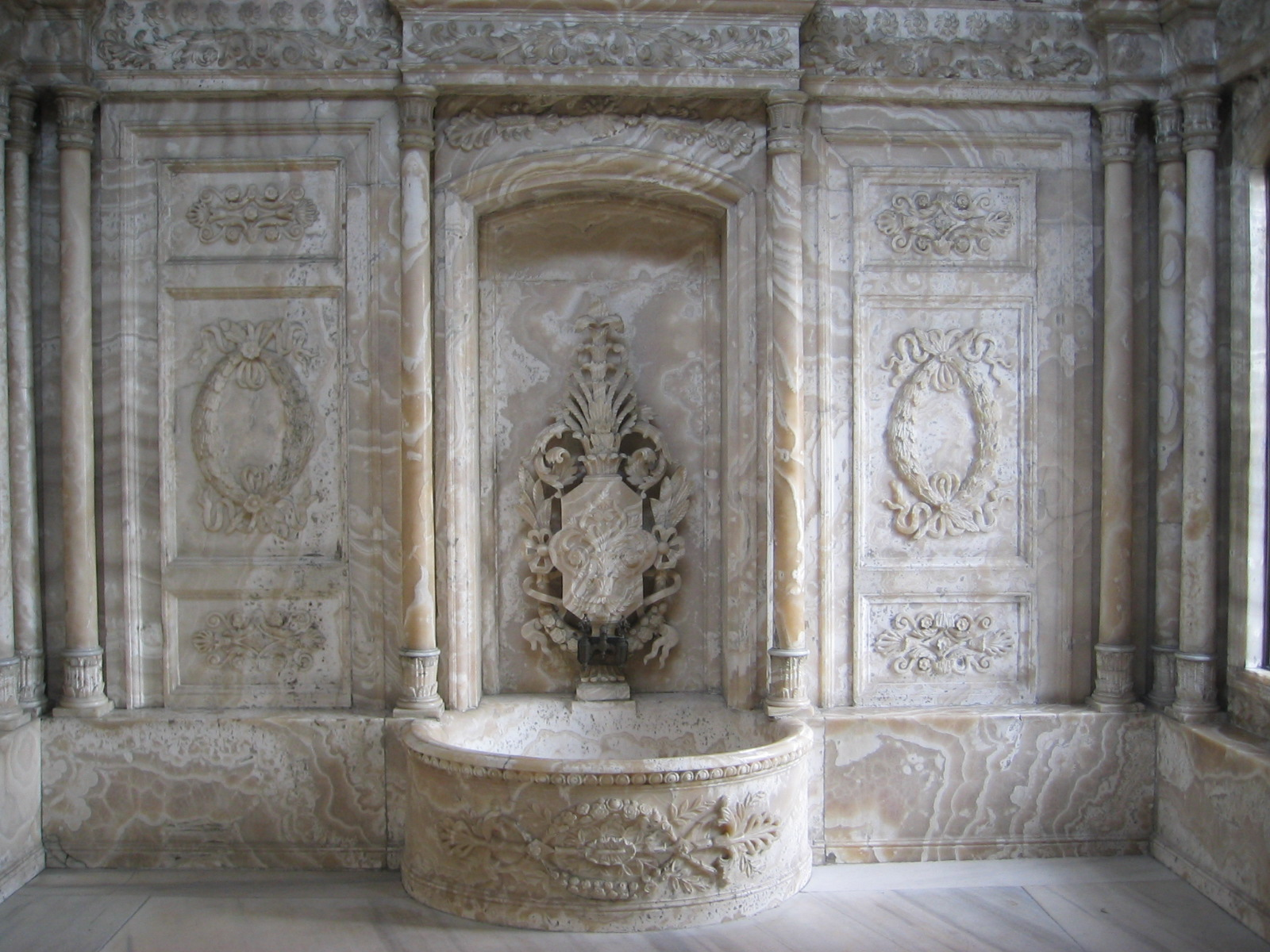
The sultan's hammam, decorated with Egyptian alabaster

Whereas the Topkapı Palace has exquisite examples of Iznik ware tiles and Ottoman carving, the Dolmabahçe is extensively decorated with gold and crystal. Fourteen tonnes of gold were used to gild the ceilings. Over 100 kg of gold was used to decorate the palace, this weight today costs US$6 million.

The world's largest crystal chandelier is in the Ceremonial Hall. It has 750 lamps and weighs 4.5 tonnes. The chandelier was originally assumed to have been a gift from Queen Victoria; in 2006, however, a receipt was discovered showing it had been paid for in full by the sultan.

Dolmabahçe has the most extensive collection of Bohemian and Baccarat crystal chandeliers in the world. The famous Crystal Staircase has the shape of a double horseshoe and is built of Baccarat crystal, brass, and mahogany.

Expensive stones such as Marmara Island (Proconnesian) marble, Egyptian alabaster (calcite, also known as onyx-marble), and porphyry from Pergamon were used for the decoration.

The palace includes a large number of Hereke palace carpets made by the Hereke Imperial Factory. The Hereke carpet featured in the main hall happens to be the largest Hereke rug in the world. Also featured are 150-year-old bearskin rugs presented initially to the sultan as a gift by Tsar Nicholas I.

A collection of 202 oil paintings is on display in the palace. A highlight of the collection are 23 paintings by Ivan Aivazovsky which he created as a court painter during his stays in Istanbul. The collection also includes paintings by Gustave Boulanger, Jean-Léon Gérôme, Eugène Fromentin, Stanisław Chlebowski, Félix Ziem, Karl Joseph Kuwasseg, Fausto Zonaro, Théo van Rysselberghe and Alexander Sandor Svoboda. There are also paintings by Turkish painters such as Osman Hamdi Bey, Halil Pasha and Osman Nuri Pasha in this art museum.

From the very beginning, the palace's equipment implemented the highest technical standards. Gas lighting and water-closets were imported from Great Britain, whereas other palaces in continental Europe were still lacking these features at that time. Later, electricity, a central heating system and an elevator were installed.

== Rooms ==
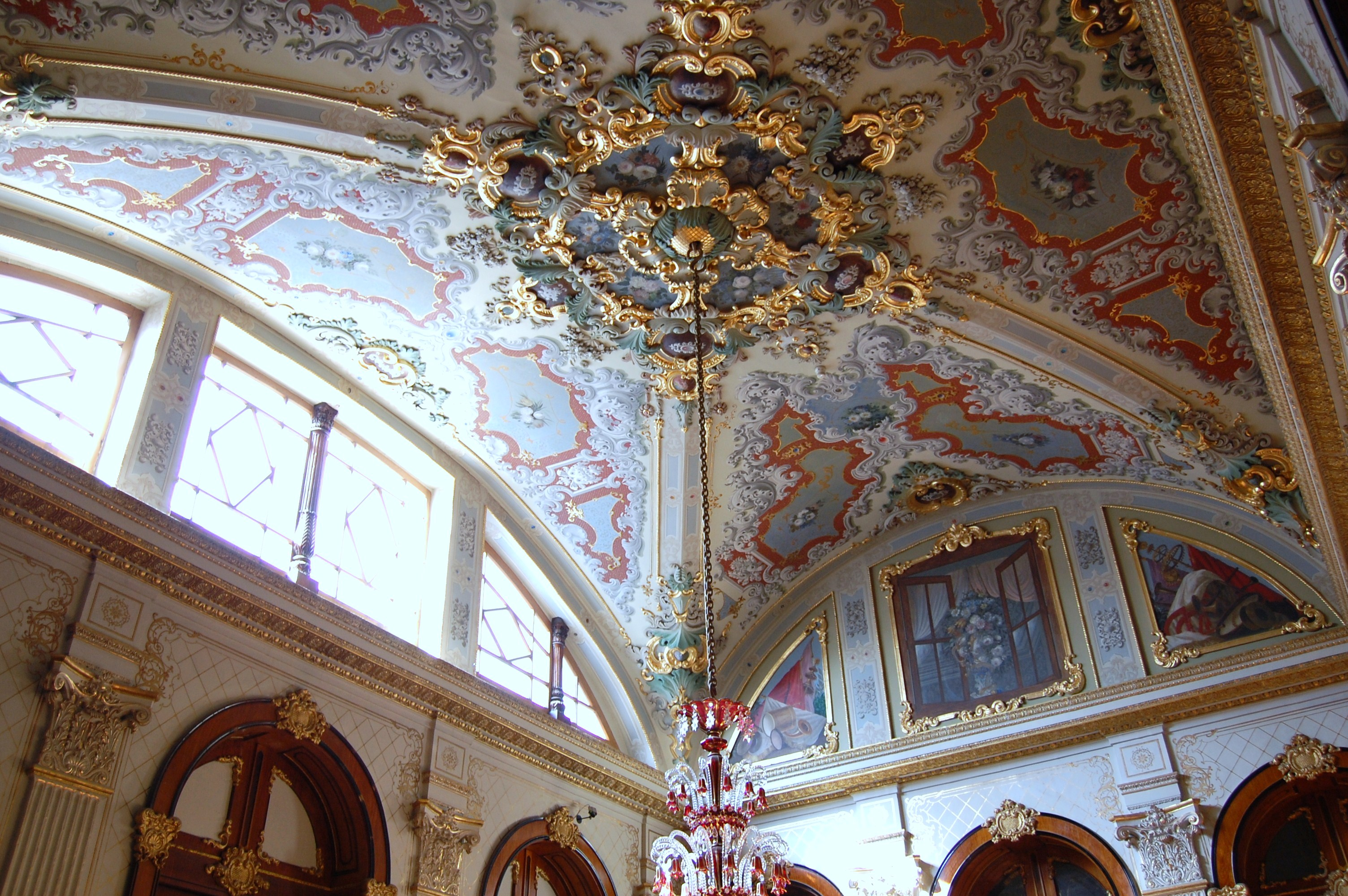
Staircases of the palace

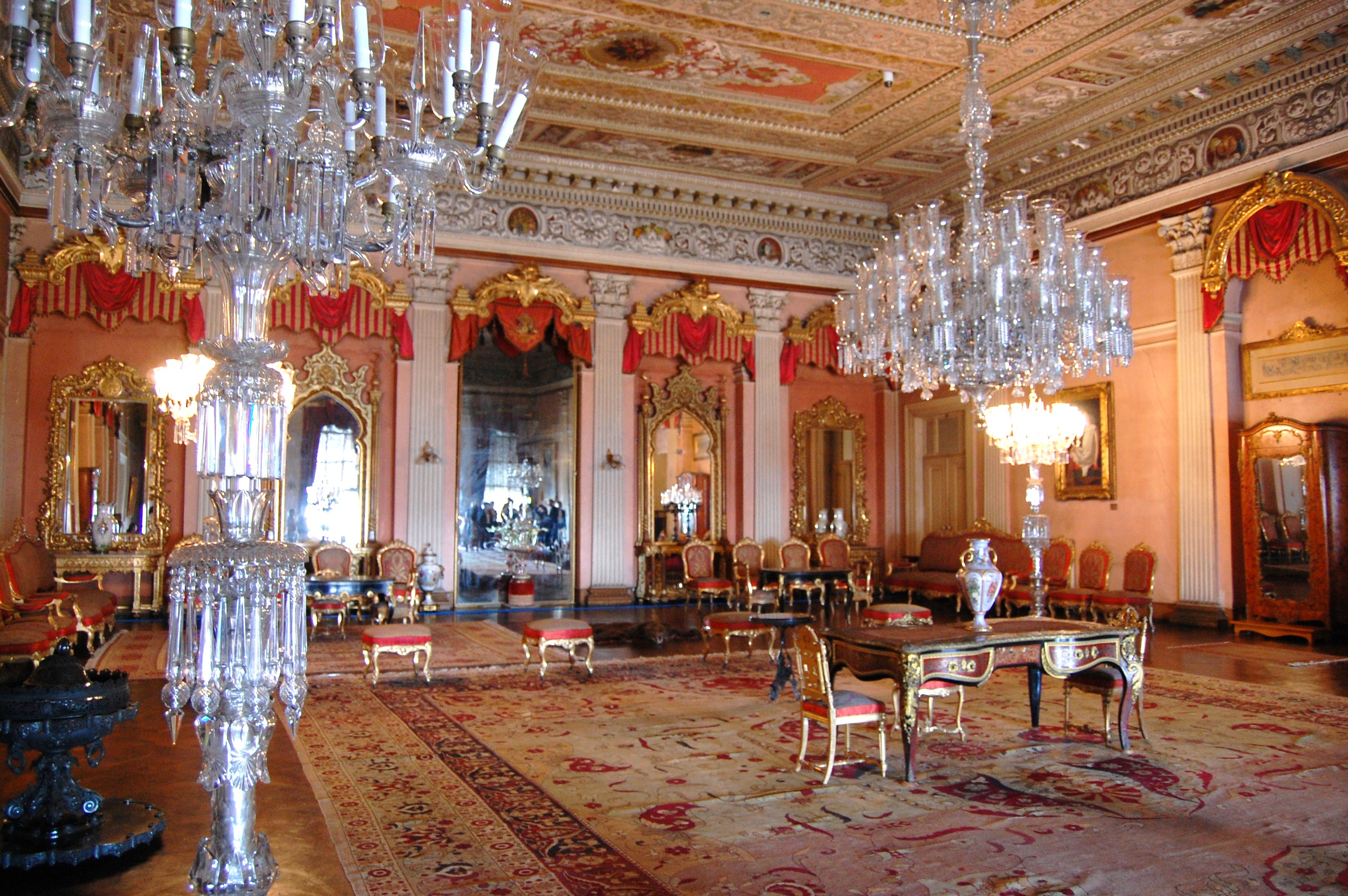
The Pink Hall

=== Medhal (Main Entrance) Hall ===
The tughra of Abdülmecid I

A visit to the Dolmabahçe Palace begins at the Medhal Hall. Rooms leading off the Medhal are towards the sea and the land. The rooms facing the sea were used by the leading officials, the grand vizier, and the other state ministers. Rooms facing the mainland were used by various administrators of the palace and the state, such as the Palace Marshal, the Shaykh al-Islām (Şeyhülislam), and members of the General Assembly.

Guests would first wait in this hall and then would be led inside at the proper time by a palace protocol officer. On entering the Medhal, one sees Boulle tables on both sides of the room, which bear the tughra of Sultan Abdülmecid on top. The royal monogram of the sultan is also on the fireplace. The English chandelier hanging in the middle of this room has sixty arms. The Hereke fabrics used as upholstery for the furniture and as draperies are in the royal shade of red.

=== The secretariat's rooms ===
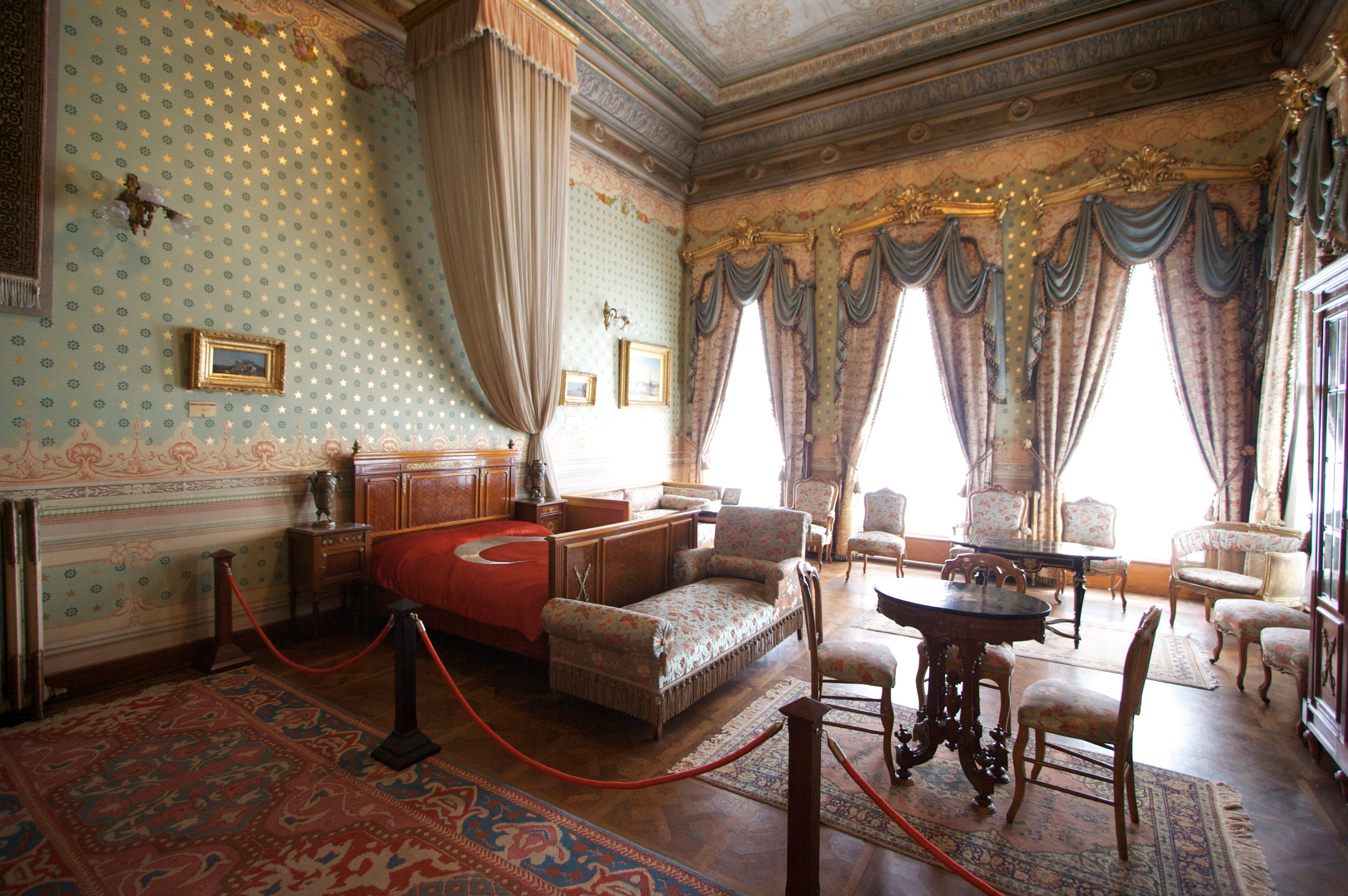
Atatürk's deathbed

The second room after the Medhal to the right is the Clerk's Hall, also referred to as the Tiled Room. The largest painting in the palace collection, a depiction of the Surre Procession by Stefano Ussi, hangs on the left wall of this hall. Surre was used to refer to the caravans which travelled from Istanbul to Mecca during the religious month of Recep, bearing the monetary aid used to support the maintenance and the decoration of the Kaaba and to provide financial assistance to the local population of Hejaz.

On the wall to the right is a painting signed by Rudolf Ernst depicting the fire at the Paris Municipal Theater and another painting of a Dutch Village Girl by Delandre. Decorated with French style furniture, this room also contains very valuable porcelain vases.

=== Atatürk's room ===
Mustafa Kemal Atatürk spent the last days of his life in the palace as his health deteriorated. He died at 9:05 A.M. on November 10, 1938, in a bedroom located in the former harem area of the palace. All the clocks in the palace were stopped and set to 9:05 after his death. The clocks outside of his room now are set to the actual time in Turkey, but the clock in the room in which he died still points to 9:05.

=== Harem ===
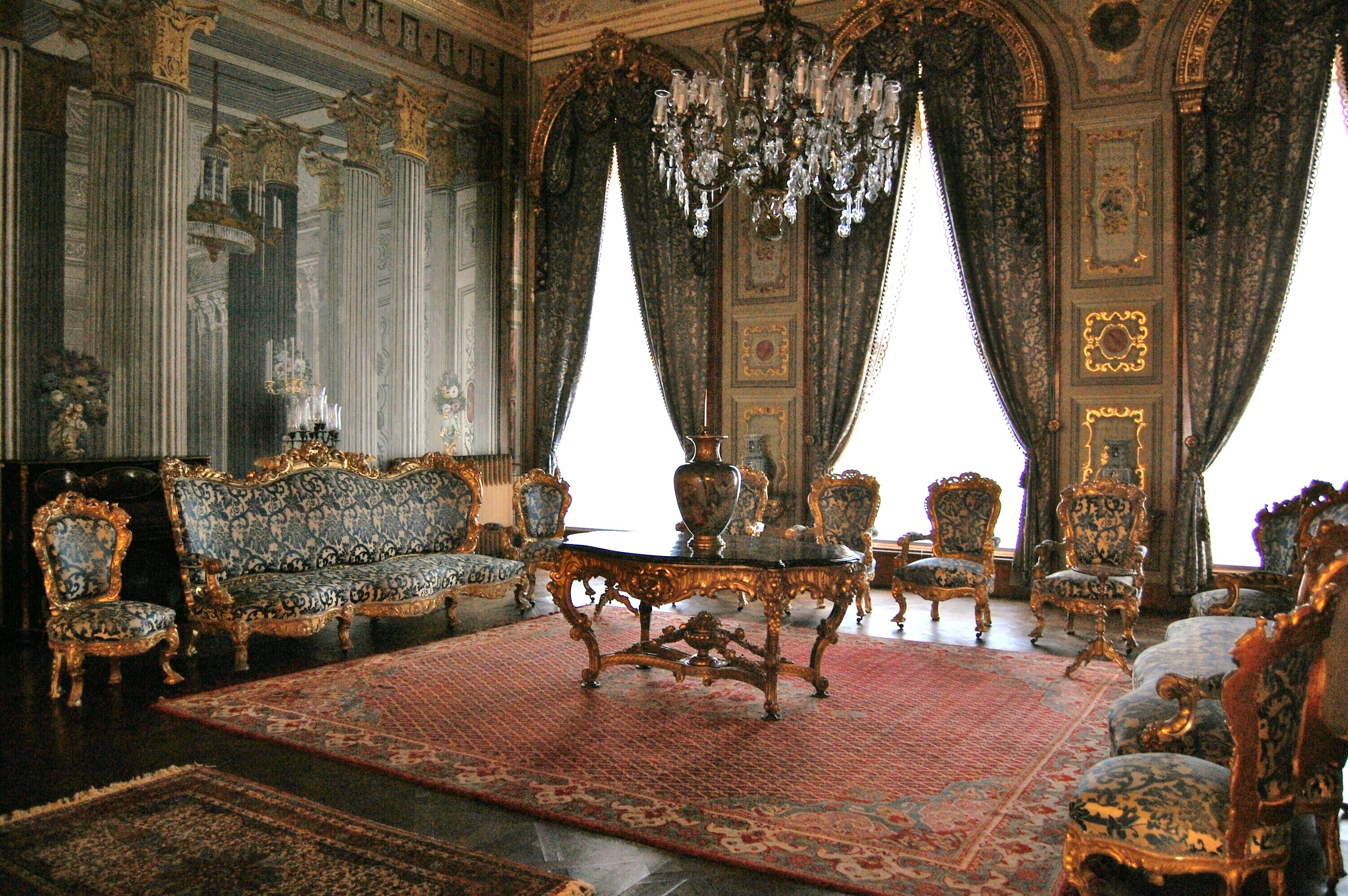
Blue Hall in Harem section of the palace

The harem was a traditional feature of many Middle Eastern architectural structures throughout history. The point of Abdulmecid's construction of the harem was to ensure there were separate quarters built for the royal family and their leisure. It was common practice for the sultan's concubines to reside within the harem. Rooms meant to house and educate the children of the sultan, as well as the sultan's living quarters, are included in what would be considered the harem.

Sultans had previously restricted their wives and concubines to the harem from public spaces. Abdulmecid unprecedentedly allowed them to leave the palace to go to shops and bazaars under supervision.

== Gates ==
=== Gate of the Sultan ===
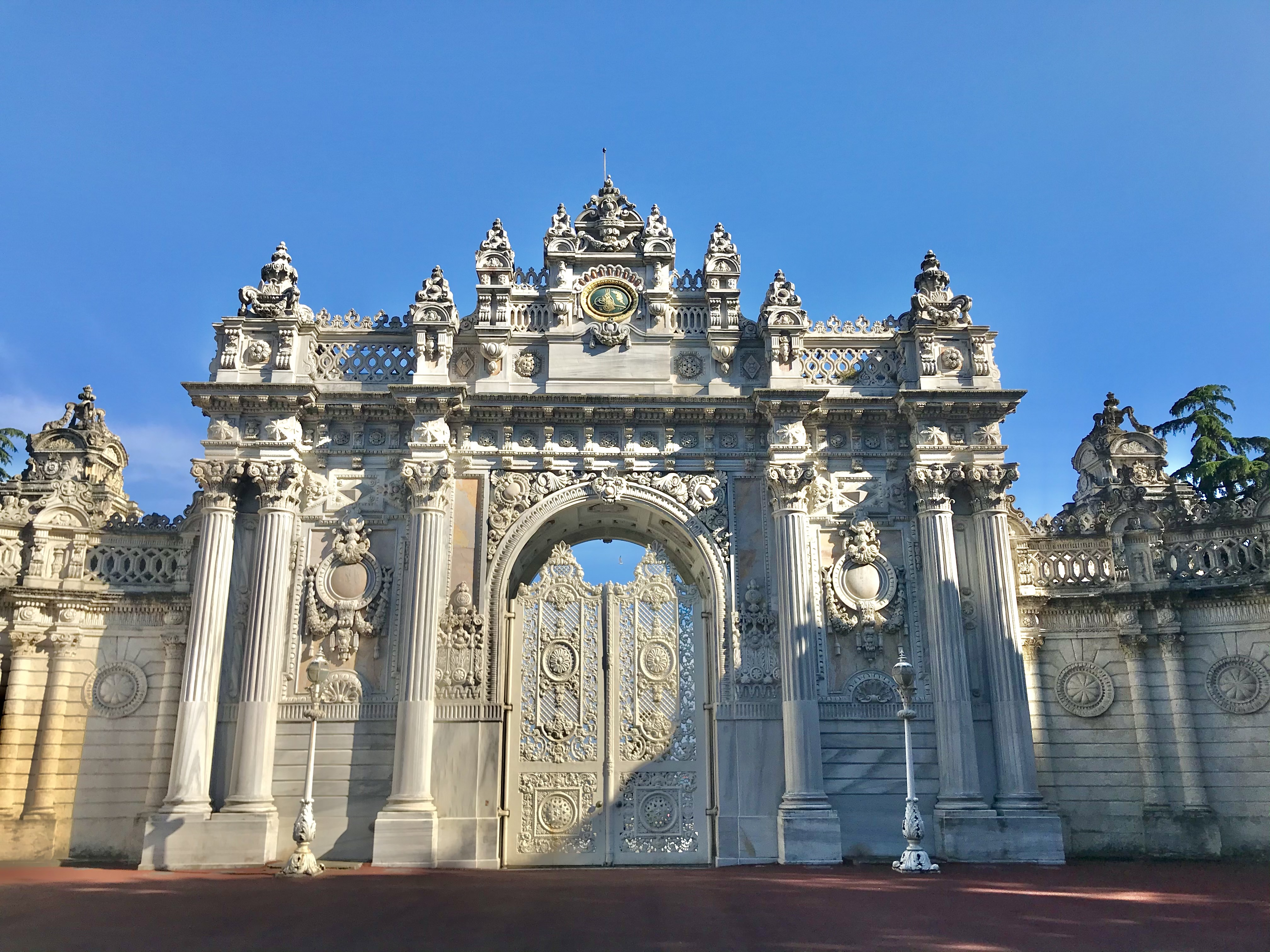
Exterior façade of the Gate of the Sultan (Saltanat Kapısı) on Dolmabahçe Avenue. The columns of the gate are in a formation of 2-1-1-2.

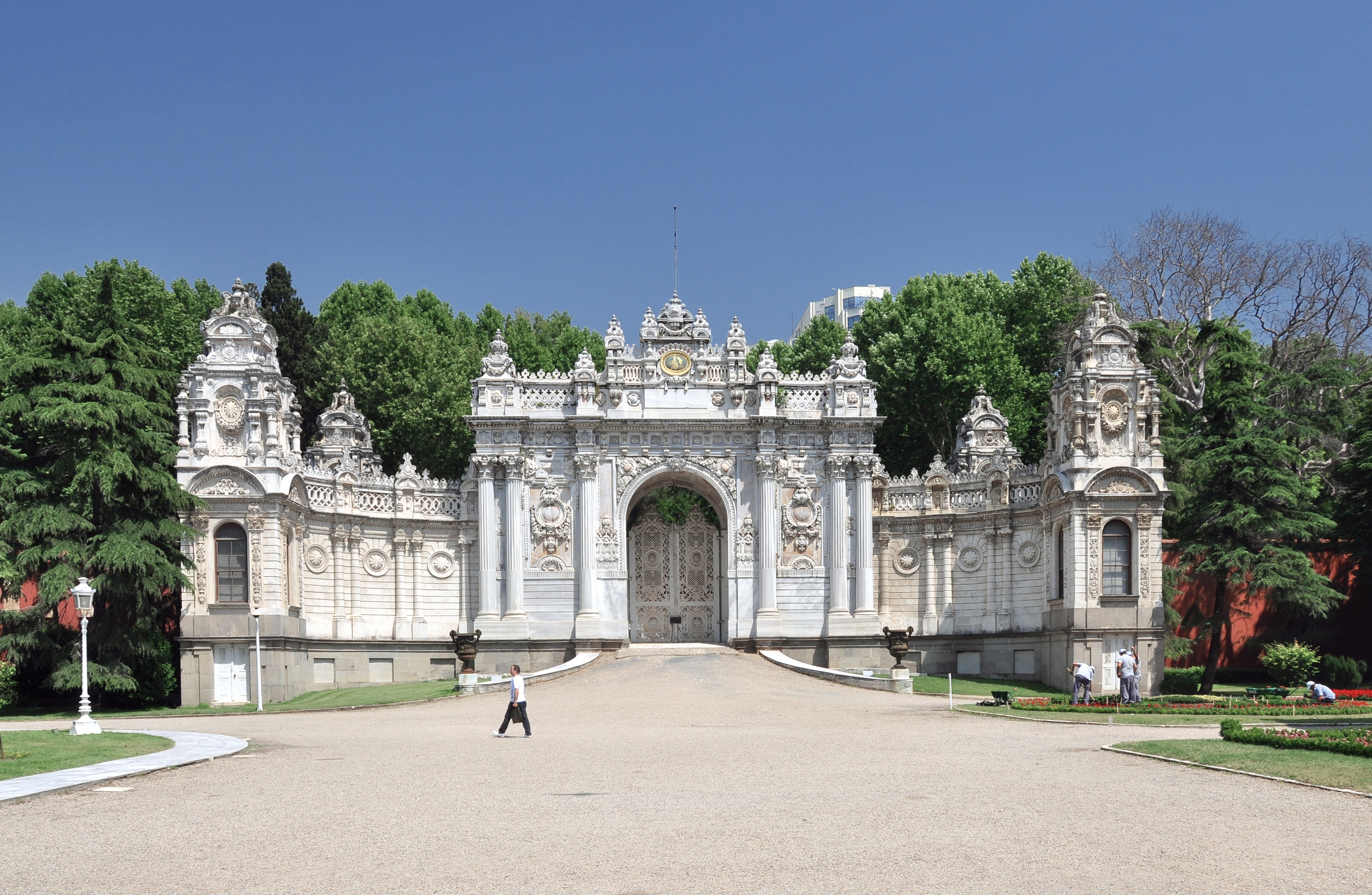
Interior façade of the Gate of the Sultan (Saltanat Kapısı). The columns are in a formation of 2-1-1-2.

=== Gate of the Treasury ===
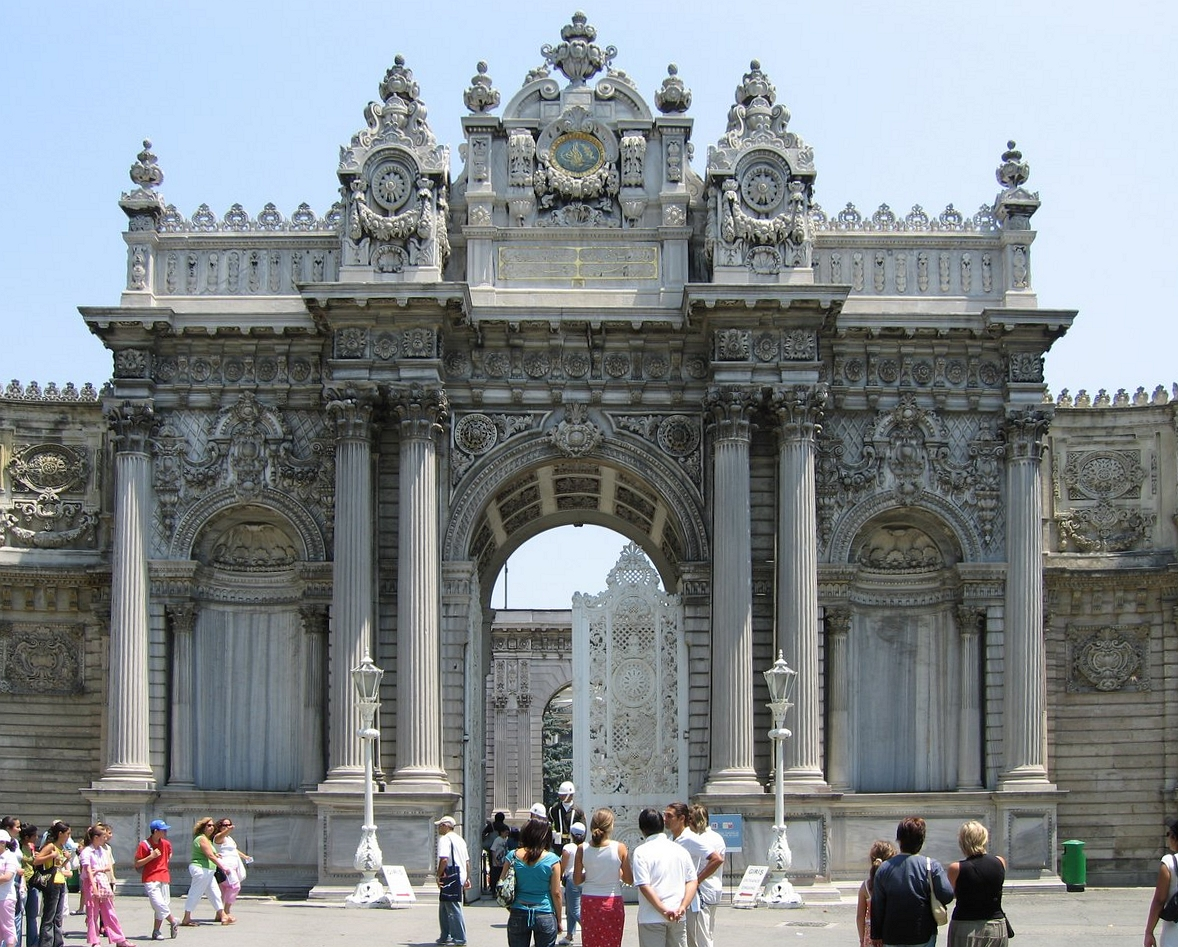
Exterior façade of the Gate of the Treasury (Hazine-i Hassa Kapısı) near Dolmabahçe Clock Tower. The columns of the exterior façade of the gate are in a formation of 1-2-2-1.

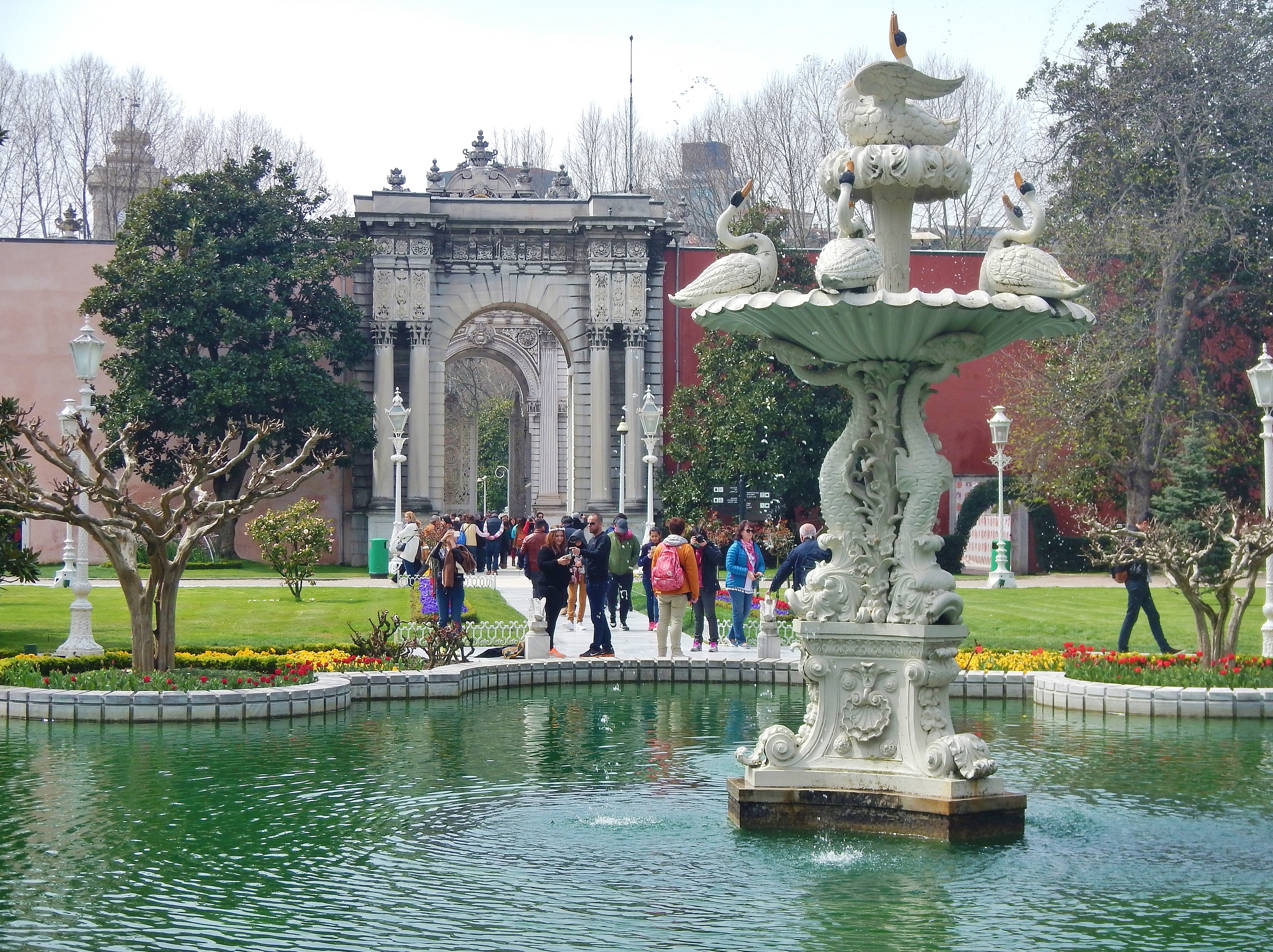
Interior façade of the Gate of the Treasury (Hazine-i Hassa Kapısı) near Dolmabahçe Clock Tower, which is seen in the background, outside the walls, at left.

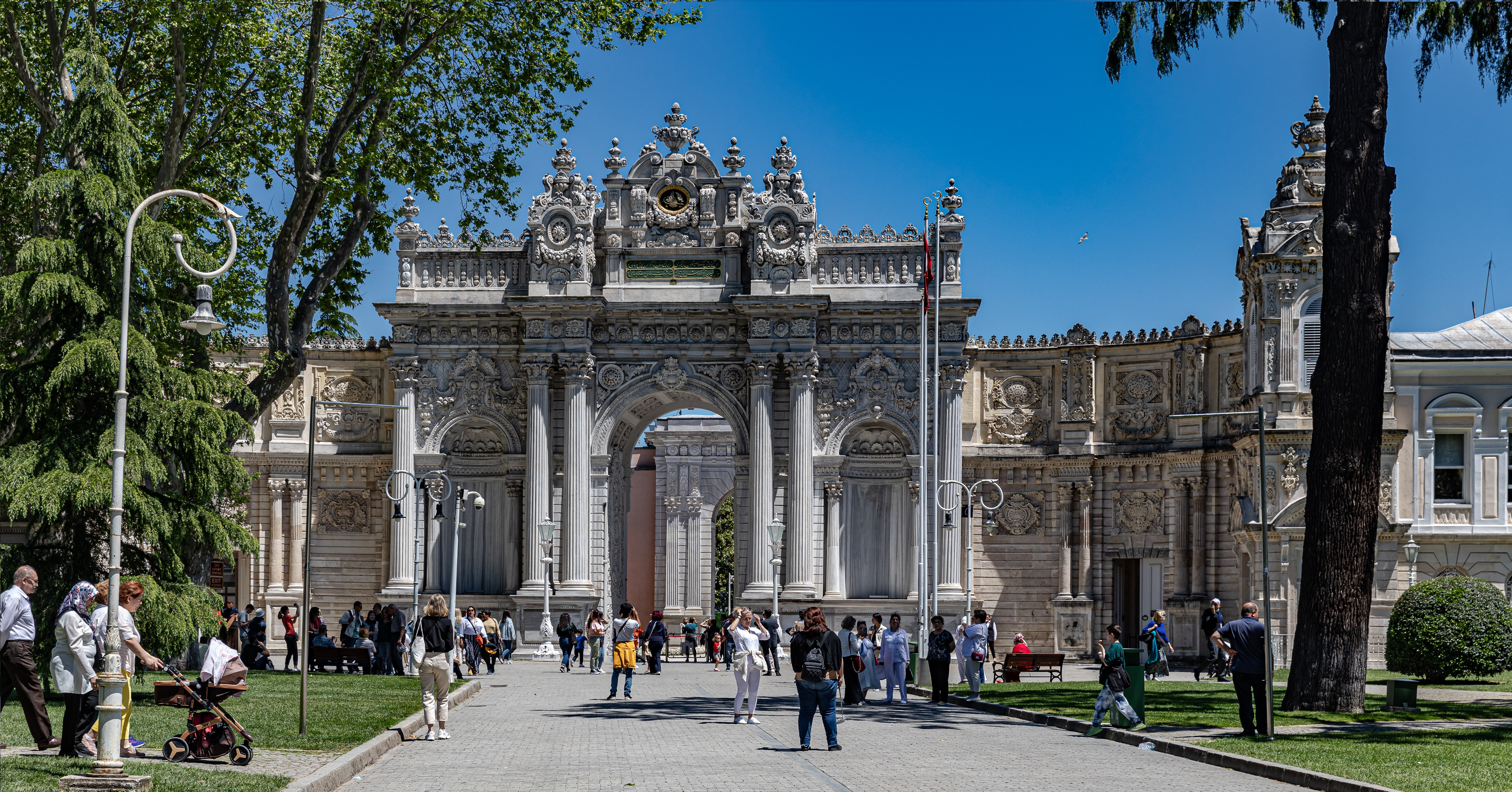
Exterior façade of the Gate of the Treasury after the restoration work

=== Gate to the Bosporus ===
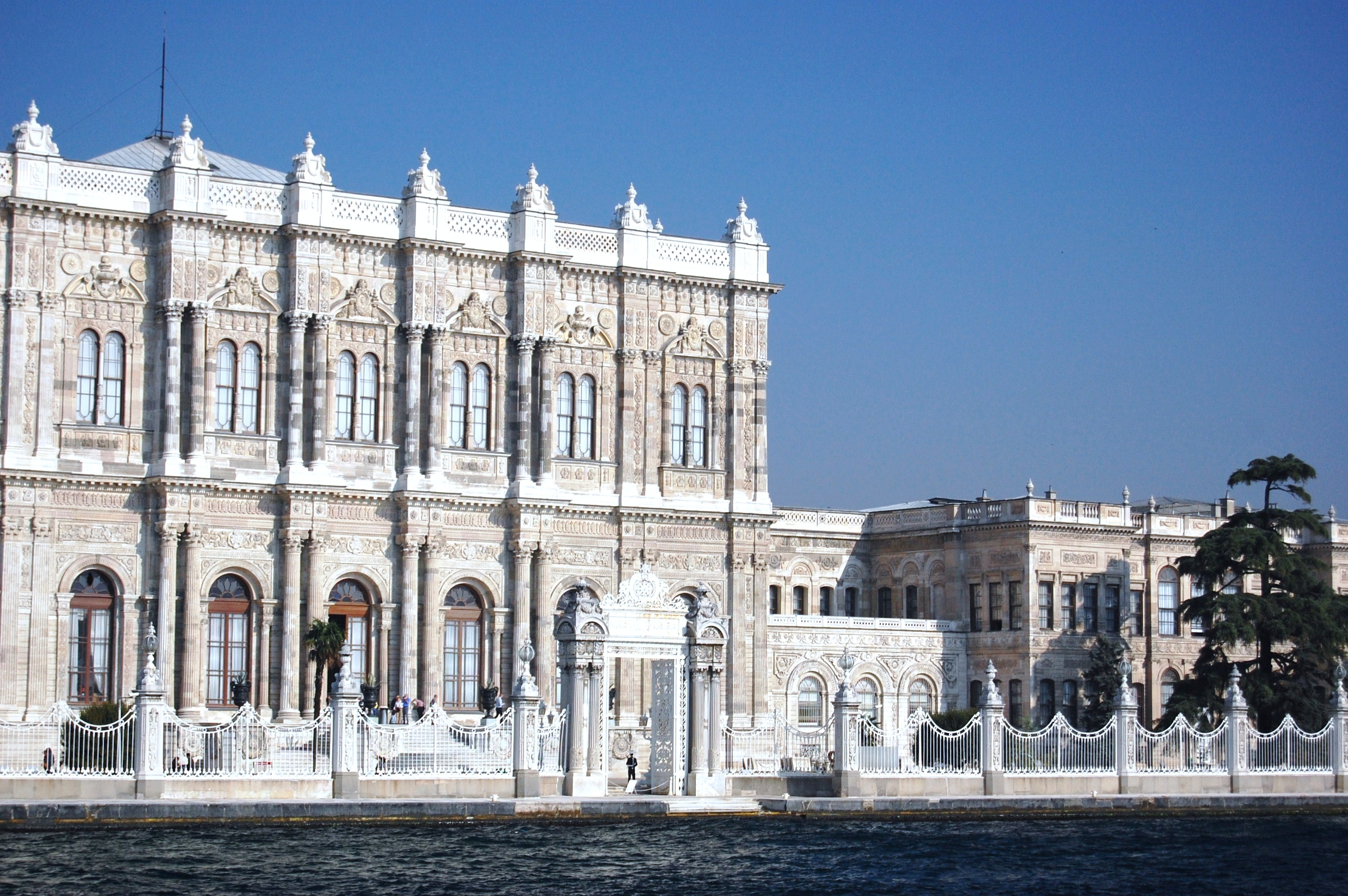
Exterior view of the Gate to the Bosporus

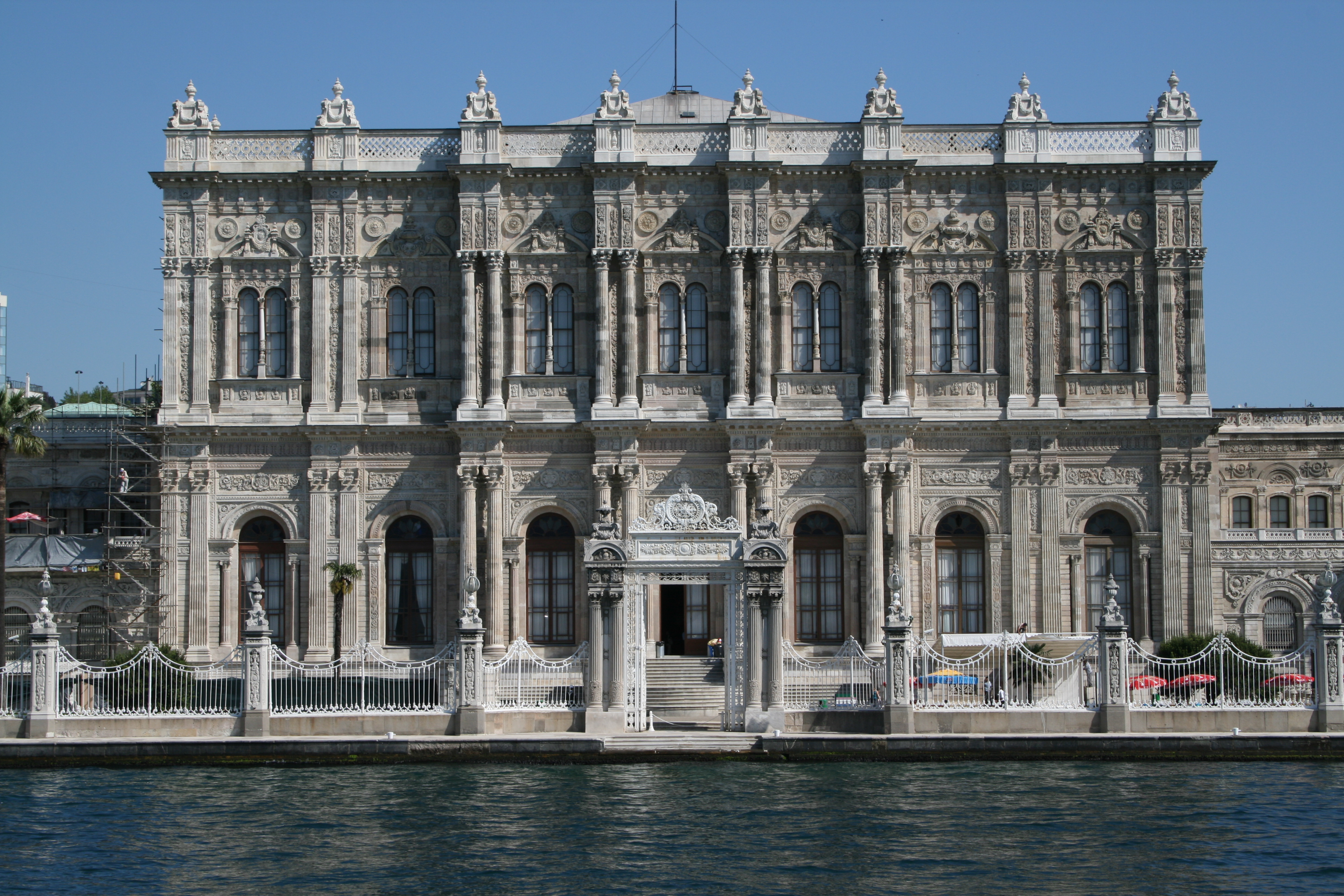
Exterior view of the Gate to the Bosporus

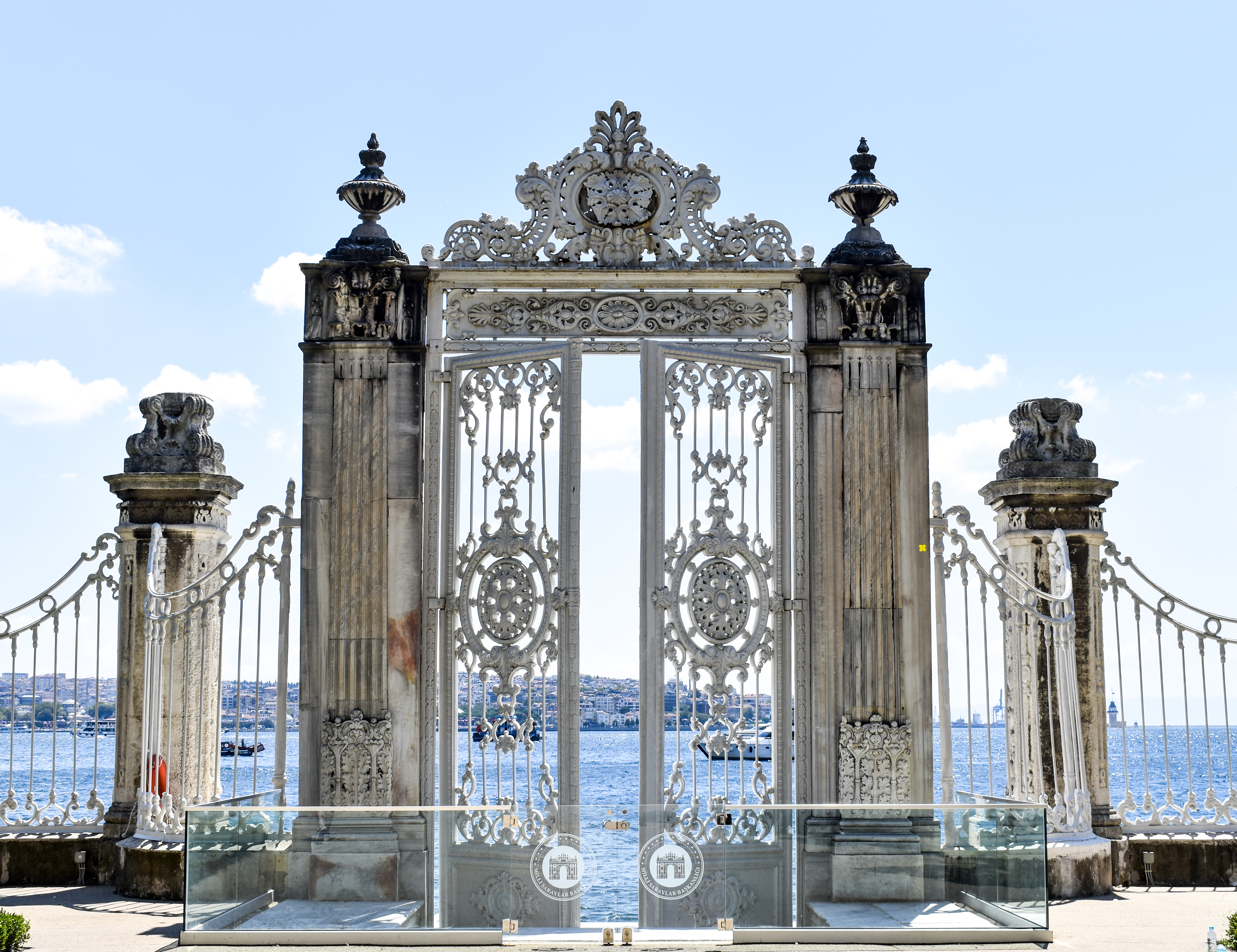
Interior view of the Gate to the Bosporus

== Adjacent buildings ==
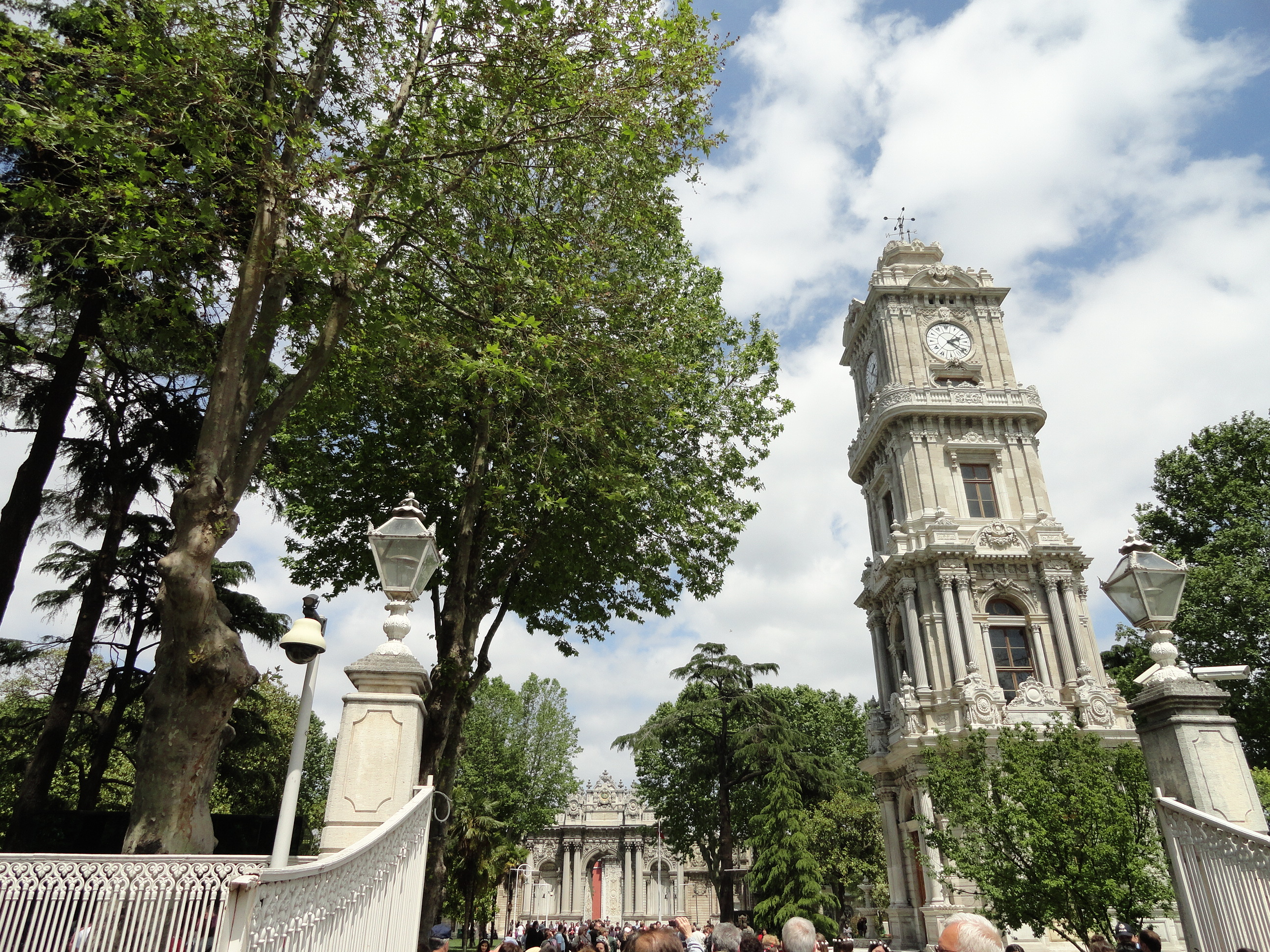
Dolmabahçe Clock Tower near the Bosporus shoreline, with the Gate of the Treasury seen in the background.

A number of further residential buildings are located near the palace including the palace of the Crown Prince (Veliaht Dairesi), the quarters of the gentlemen-in-waiting (Musahiban Dairesi), the dormitories of the servants (Agavat Dairesi, Bendegan Dairesi) and of the guards (Baltacılar Dairesi), the quarters of the Chief Eunuch (Kızlarağası Dairesi). Further buildings include imperial kitchens (Matbah-i Amire), stables, an aviary (Kusluk), a plant nursery (Fidelik), a flour mill, a greenhouse (Sera), a Hereke carpet workshop (Hereke dökümhanesi), a glass manufactory, a foundry, a pharmacy etc.

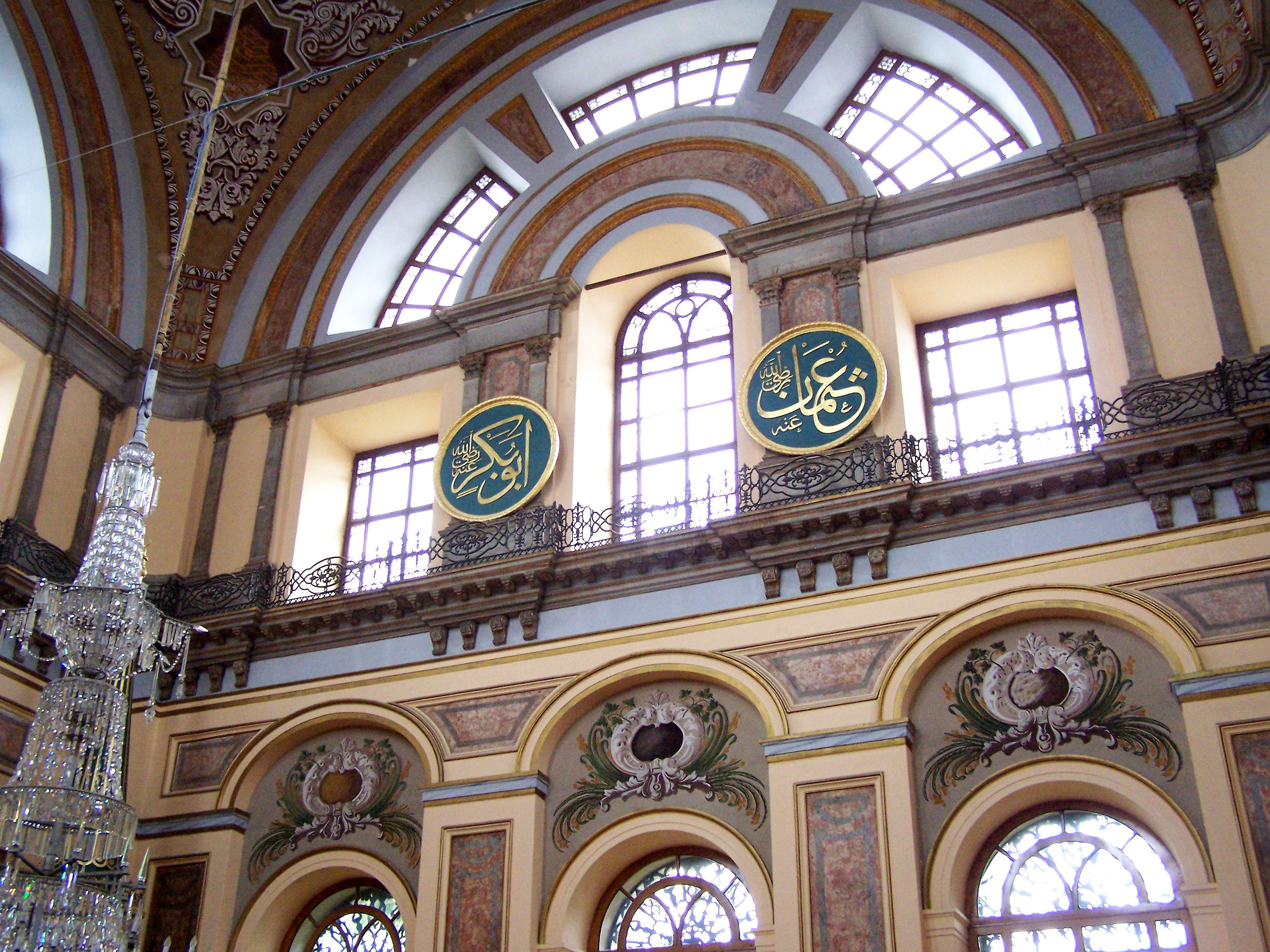
Interior of the Dolmabahçe Mosque

A baroque style mosque designed by Garabet Balyan was built near the palace in 1853–1855. It was commissioned by queen mother Bezm-i Âlem Valide Sultan. Since 1948 the building housed the Naval Museum, but the museum was moved to another location in 1960 after the coup d'état of May, 27th. In 1967, the mosque was returned for worship. A clock tower (Dolmabahçe Saat Kulesi) was erected in front of the Imperial Gate (Saltanat Kapisi) on a square along the European waterfront of Bosporus next to the mosque. The tower was ordered by Sultan Abdülhamid II and designed by the court architect Sarkis Balyan between 1890 and 1895. Its clock was manufactured by the French clockmaker house of Jean-Paul Garnier, and installed by the court clock master Johann Mayer.

== See also ==
- List of Baroque residences

== Literature ==
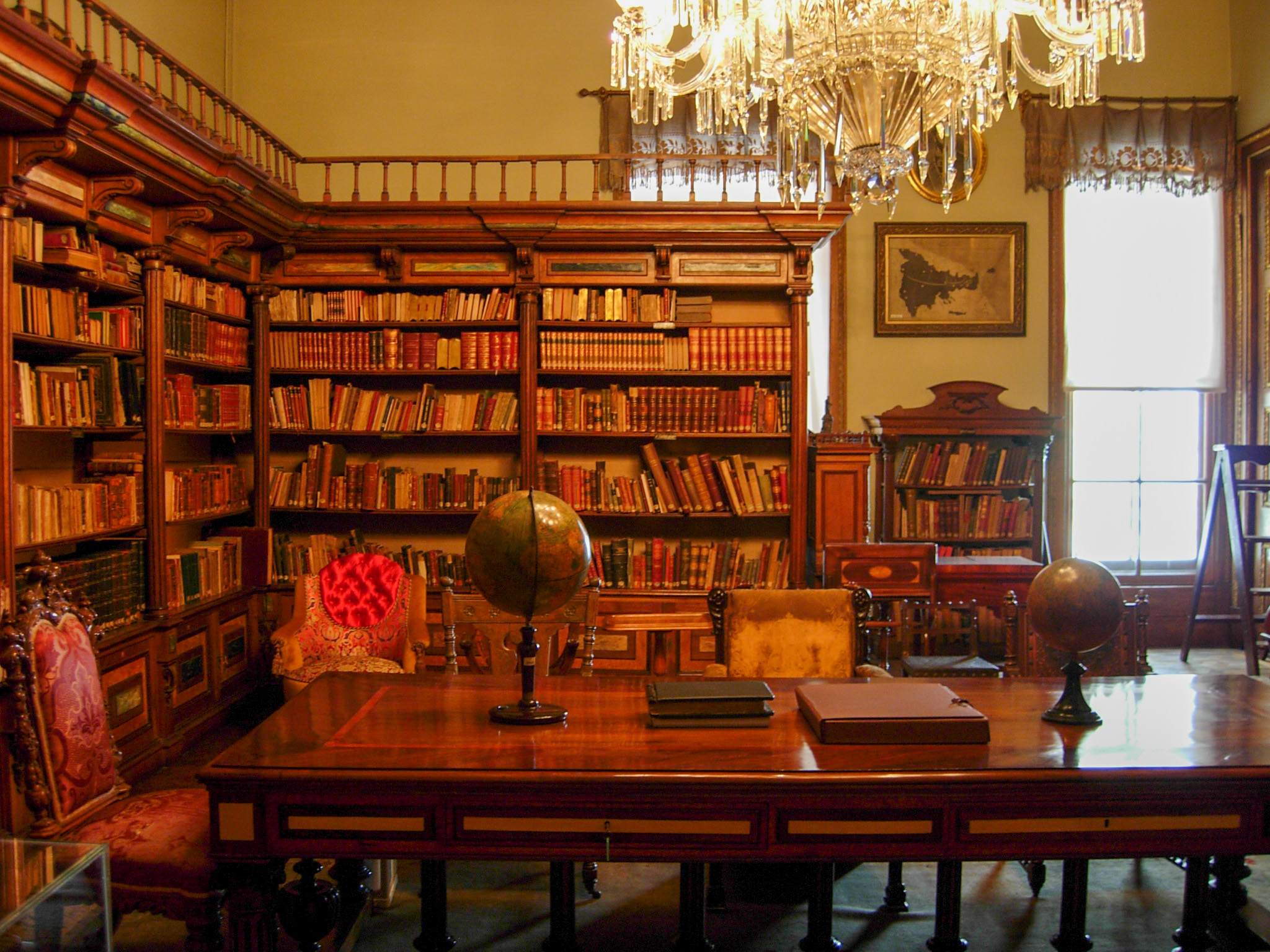
The sultan's library

- Yücel, İhsan; Sema Öner (1989). Dolmabahçe Palace. Istanbul: TBMM National Palaces Trust. ASIN B000GYA5C8.
- Akat, Yücel (1988). The Dolmabahçe Palace. Istanbul: Keskin Color. ASIN B000GW7QYA.
- Yücel, İhsan (1995). Dolmabahçe Palace. Istanbul: TBMM Department of National Palaces. ISBN 975-7479-42-X.
- Gülersoy, Çelik (1990). Dolmabahçe Palace and its environs. Istanbul: İstanbul Kitaplığı. p. 257. ISBN 978-975-7687-03-0.
- Keskin, Naci (1975). The Dolmabahçe Palace. Istanbul: Keskin Color. ASIN B000OSH36M.
- Dolmabahçe Palace. Istanbul: Do-Gu Yayınları. 1998. ASIN B000E1S49O.
- İskender Pala. The Jewel on the Bosphorus; Dolmabahçe Palace. TBMM Milli Saraylar Yayınları, Istanbul, 2006.
- İhsan Yücel, Sema Öner, F. Yaşar Yılmaz, Cengiz Göncü, Hakan Gülsün. Dolmabahçe Palace. TBMM Milli Saraylar Yayınları, Istanbul, 2005.
- İpek Fitöz. European Lights In Dolmabahçe Palace. TBMM Milli Saraylar Yayınları, Istanbul, 2007.
