= Oriental carpets in Renaissance painting =

Aspect of art history

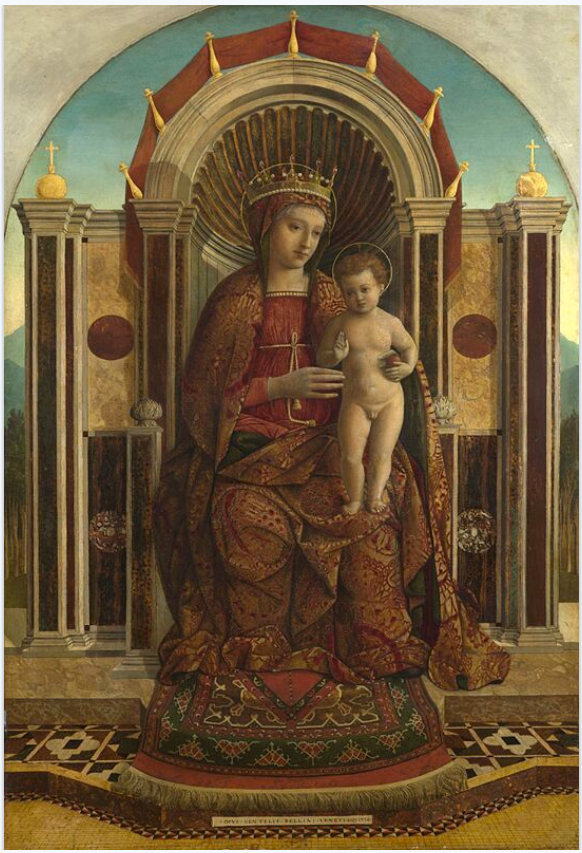
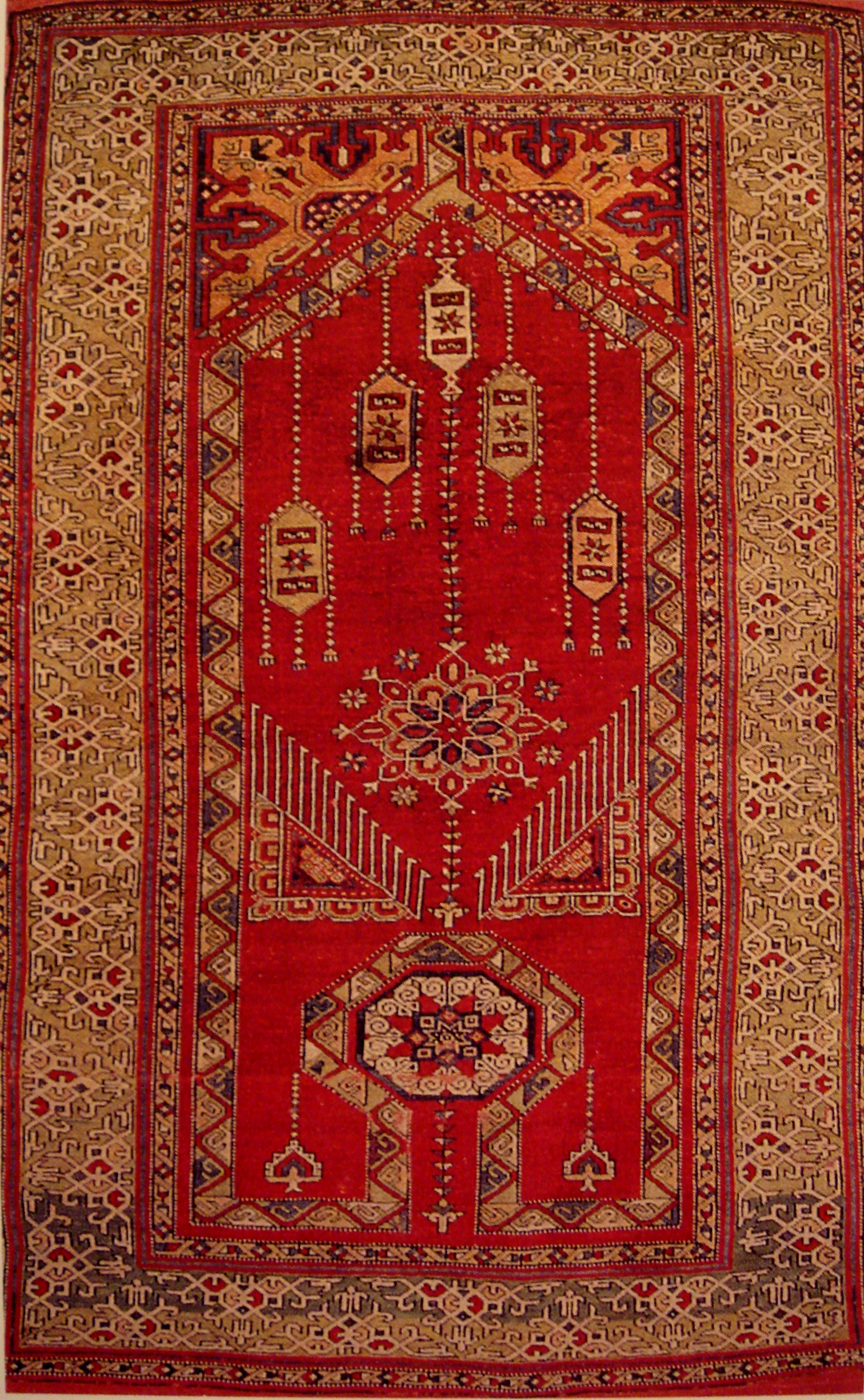
Left image: A "Bellini type" Islamic prayer rug, seen from the top, at the feet of the Virgin Mary, in Gentile Bellini's Madonna and Child Enthroned, late 15th century.
Right image: Prayer rug, Anatolia, late 15th to early 16th century, with "re-entrant" keyhole motif.
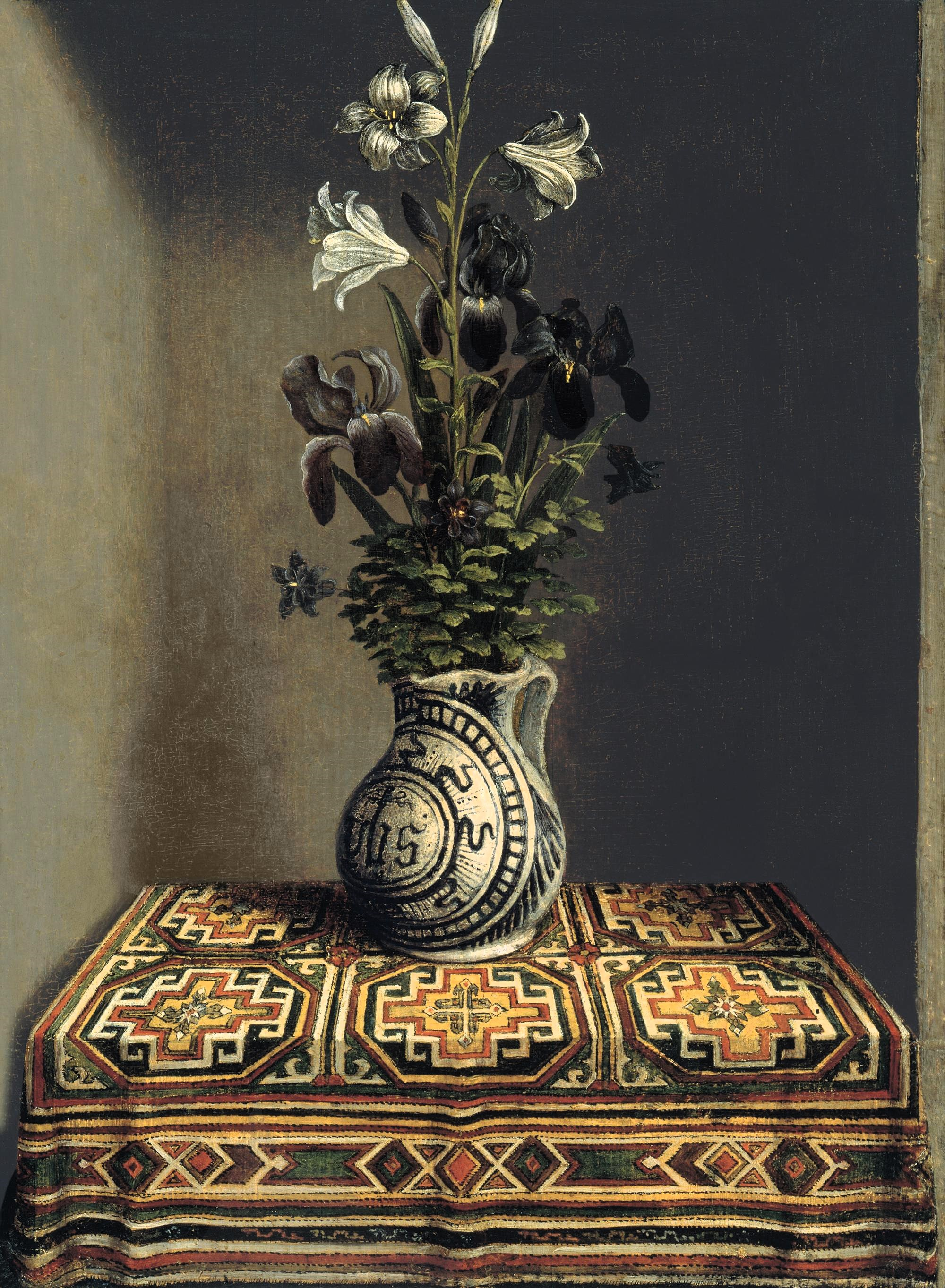
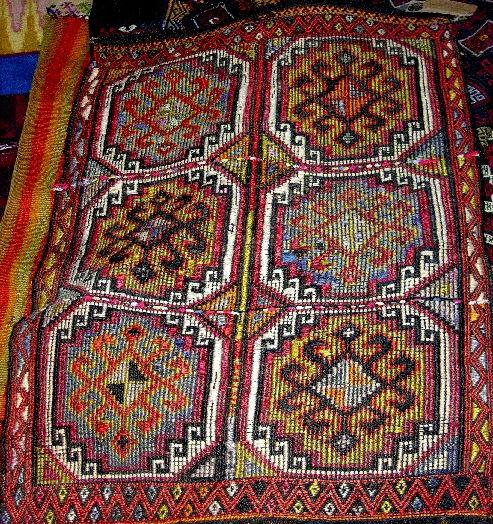
Left image: Hans Memling's Still Life with a Jug with Flowers, late 15th century.
Right image: Mugan carpet, Karabakh school, late 14th to early 15th century, Azerbaijan Carpet Museum

Carpets of Middle-Eastern origin, either from Anatolia, Persia, Armenia, Levant, the Mamluk state of Egypt or Northern Africa, were used as decorative features in Western European paintings from the 14th century onwards. More depictions of Oriental carpets in Renaissance painting survive than actual carpets contemporary with these paintings. Few Middle-Eastern carpets produced before the 17th century remain, though the number of these known has increased in recent decades. Therefore, comparative art-historical research has from its onset in the late 19th century relied on carpets represented in datable European paintings.

== Art historical background ==
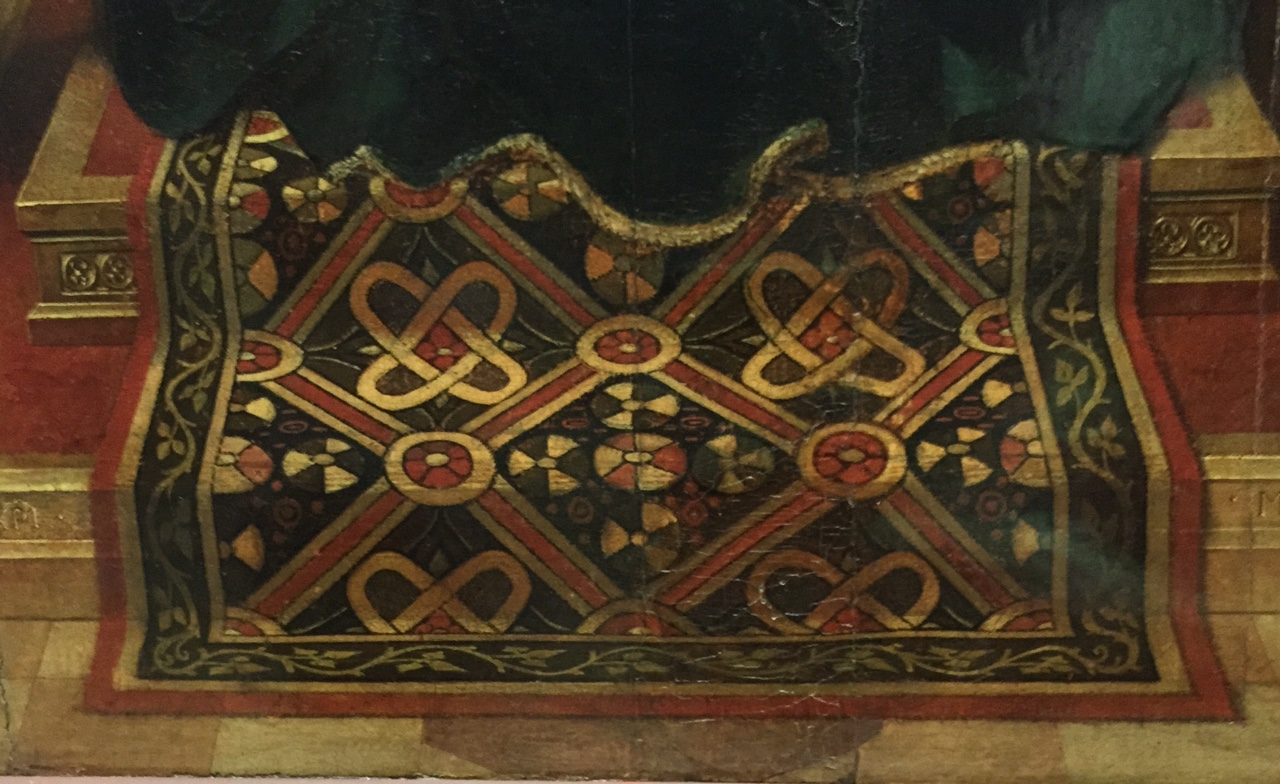
Petrus Christus, The Virgin and Child Enthroned with Saints Jerome and Francis (detail), 1457, with a realistic depiction of a pile-woven carpet. Städel Museum, Frankfurt

Jan van Eyck, Lucca Madonna (detail), c. 1430. Städel Museum, Frankfurt

Activities of scientists and collectors beginning in the late 19th century have substantially increased the corpus of surviving Oriental carpets, allowing for more detailed comparison of existing carpets with their painted counterparts. Western comparative research resulted in an ever more detailed cultural history of the Oriental art of carpet weaving. This has in turn renewed and inspired the scientific interest in their countries of origin. Comparative research based on Renaissance paintings and carpets preserved in museums and collections continues to contribute to the expanding body of art historical and cultural knowledge.

The tradition of precise realism among Western painters of the late 15th and 16th century provides pictorial material which is often detailed enough to justify conclusions about even minute details of the painted carpet. The carpets are treated with exceptional care in the rendering of colors, patterns, and details of form and design: The painted texture of a carpet depicted in Petrus Christus's Virgin and Child, the drawing of the individual patterns and motifs, and the way the pile opens where the carpet is folded over the steps, all suggest that the depicted textile is a pile-woven carpet.

Visually, the carpets serve to draw attention either to an important person, or to highlight a location where significant action is going on. In parallel with the development of Renaissance painting, initially mainly Christian saints and religious scenes are set out on the carpets. Later on, the carpets were integrated into secular contexts, but always served to represent the idea of opulence, exoticism, luxury, wealth, or status. First, their use was reserved for the most powerful and most wealthy, for royalty and nobility. Later, as more people gained sufficient wealth to afford goods of luxury, Oriental carpets appeared on the portraits of merchants and wealthy burghers. During the late 17th and 18th century, the interest in depicting carpets declined. In parallel, the paintings pay less attention to detail.

The richly designed Oriental carpets appealed strongly to Western painters. The rich and various colours may have influenced the great Venetian painters of the Quattrocento. It has been suggested that the pictorial representation of carpets is linked to the development of the linear perspective, which was first described by Leon Battista Alberti in 1435.

The depiction of Oriental carpets in Renaissance paintings is regarded as an important contribution to a "world history of art", based upon interactions of different cultural traditions. Rugs from the Islamic world arrived in large numbers in Western Europe by the 15th century, which is increasingly recognized as a pivotal temporal nexus in the cultural encounters that contributed to the development of Renaissance ideas, arts, and sciences. Intensified contacts, especially the increasing trade between the Islamic world and Western Europe, have provided material sources and cultural influences to Western artists during the next centuries to come. In turn, European market demands also affected the carpet production in their countries of origin.

== Origin and limitations of the comparative approach ==
In 1871, Julius Lessing published his book on Oriental carpet design. He was relying more on European paintings than on the examination of actual carpets for lack of material, because ancient Oriental carpets were not yet collected at the time when he worked on his book. Lessing's approach has proven very useful to establish a scientific chronology of Oriental carpet weaving, and was further elaborated and expanded mainly by scholars of the "Berlin school" of History of Islamic art: Wilhelm von Bode, and his successors Friedrich Sarre, Ernst Kühnel, and Kurt Erdmann developed the "ante quem" method for the dating of oriental carpets based on Renaissance paintings.

These art historians were also aware of the fact that their scientific approach was biased: Only carpets produced by manufactories were exported to Western Europe, and consequently were available to the Renaissance artists. Village or nomadic rugs did not reach Europe during the Renaissance, and were not depicted in paintings. Not until the mid twentieth century, when collectors like Joseph V. McMullan or James F. Ballard recognized the artistic and art historic value of village or nomadic carpets, were they appreciated in the Western World.

== Characteristics ==
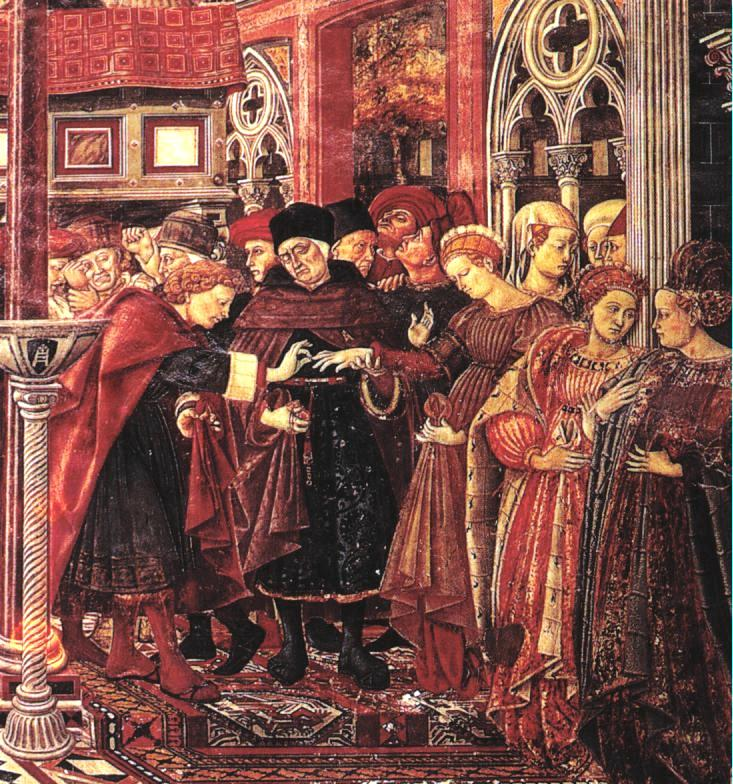
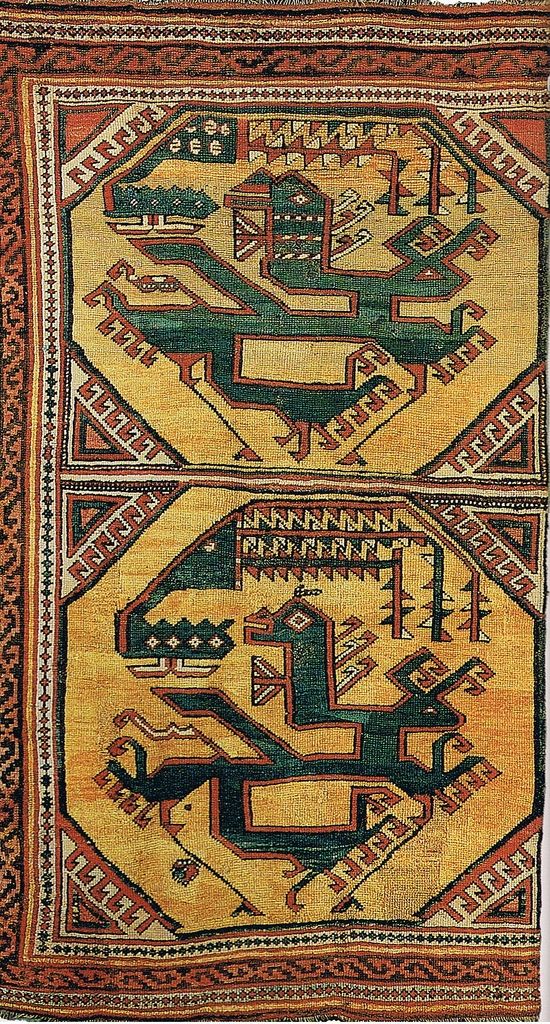
Left image: Domenico di Bartolo's The Marriage of the Foundlings features a large carpet with a Chinese-inspired phoenix-and-dragon pattern, 1440.
Right image: Phoenix-and-dragon carpet, first half or middle of the 15th century, Berlin.
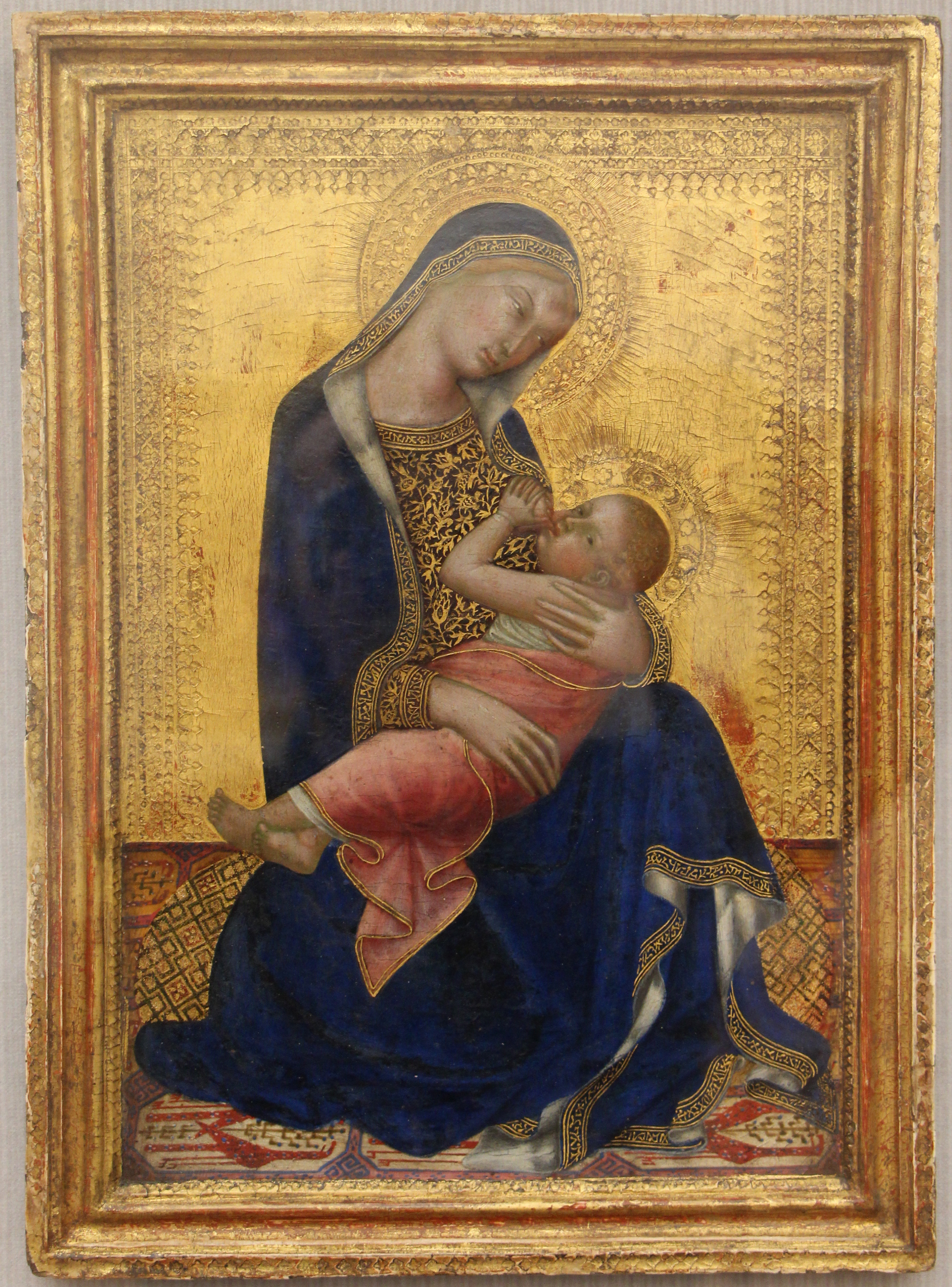
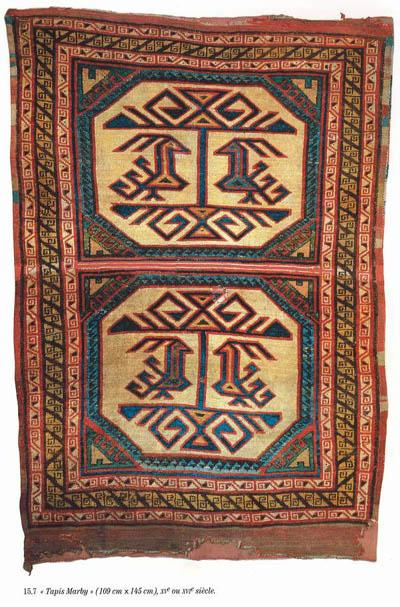
Left image: Lippo Memmi's Virgin Mary and Child features an "animal carpet" with two opposed birds besides a tree, 1340-50.
Right image: Anatolian animal carpet, circa 1500, found in Marby Church, Sweden.

Pile carpets with geometric design are known to have been produced from the 13th century among the Seljuks of Rum in eastern Anatolia, whom Venice had had commercial relations since 1220. The Medieval trader and traveler Marco Polo himself mentioned that the carpets produced at Konya were the best in the world:

...et ibi fiunt soriani et tapeti pulchriores de mundo et pulchrioris coloris.
"...and here they make the most beautiful silks and carpets in the world, and with the most beautiful colours."

Carpets were also produced in Islamic Spain, and one is shown in a fresco of the 1340s in the Palais des Papes, Avignon. The vast majority of carpets in 15th- and 16th-century paintings are either from the Ottoman Empire, or possibly European copies of these types from the Balkans, Spain, or elsewhere. In fact these were not the finest Islamic carpets of the period, and few of the top-quality Turkish "court" carpets are seen. Even finer than these, Persian carpets do not appear until the end of the 16th century, but become increasingly popular among the very wealthy in the 17th century. The very refined Mamluk carpets from Egypt are occasionally seen, mostly in Venetian paintings.

One of the first uses of an Oriental carpet in a European painting is Simone Martini's Saint Louis of Toulouse Crowning Robert of Anjou, King of Naples, painted in 1316–1319. Another Anatolian animal carpet appears in a c. 1340–45 Sienese panel of the Holy Family attributed to Pietro or Ambrogio Lorenzetti (Abegg-Stiftung, Riggisberg) with alternating black and white animals within colorful octagonal medallions. European depictions of Oriental carpets were extremely faithful to the originals, judging by comparison with the few surviving examples of actual rugs of contemporary date. Their larger scale also allows more detailed and accurate depictions than those shown in miniature paintings from Turkey or Persia.

Most carpets use Islamic geometric designs, with the earliest ones also using animal patterns such as the originally Chinese-inspired "phoenix-and-dragon", as in Domenico di Bartolo's Marriage of the Foundlings (1440). These had been stylised and simplified into near-geometric motifs in their transmission to the Islamic world. The whole group, referred to in the literature as "animal rugs" disappeared from paintings by about the end of the 15th century. Only a handful of original animal-pattern carpets survive, two from European churches, where their rarity presumably preserved them. The "Marby rug", one of the finest examples, was preserved in a church of the Swedish town of Marby, and a bold adaptation of an originally Chinese "dragon and phoenix" motif is in Berlin. Both are rugs, less than 2 metres long, and about 1 metre wide, with two compartments, though the Berlin carpet lacks a border down one long side. The "Dragon and Phoenix" and the "Marby" rugs were the only existing examples of animal carpets known until 1988. Since then, seven more carpets of this type have been found. They survived in Tibetan monasteries and were removed by monks fleeing to Nepal during the Chinese cultural revolution. One of these carpets was acquired by the Metropolitan Museum of Art, which parallels a painting by the Sienese artist Gregorio di Cecco, The Marriage of the Virgin, 1423. It shows large confronted animals, each with a smaller animal inside.

Although the carpets were displayed on a public floor in a few examples, most carpets on the floor are in an area reserved for the main protagonists, very often on a dais or in front of an altar, or down steps in front of the Virgin Mary or saints, or rulers, in the manner of a modern red carpet. This presumably reflected the contemporary practice of royalty; in Denmark the 16th century Persian Coronation Carpet is used under the throne for coronations to this day. They are also often hung over balustrades or out of windows for festive occasions, such as the processions through Venice shown by Vittore Carpaccio or Gentile Bellini (see gallery); when Carpaccio's St Ursula embarks they are hung over the sides of boats and footbridges.

Oriental carpets were often depicted as a decorative element in religious scenes, and were a symbol of luxury, status and taste, although they were becoming more widely available throughout the period, which is reflected in the paintings. In some cases, such as paintings by Gentile Bellini, the carpets reflect an early Orientalist interest, but for most painters they merely reflect the prestige of the carpets in Europe. A typical example is the Turkish carpet at the feet of the Virgin Mary in the 1456–1459 San Zeno Altarpiece by Andrea Mantegna (see detail).

Non-royal portrait sitters were more likely to place their carpet on a table or other piece of furniture, especially in Northern Europe, though small rugs beside a bed are not uncommon, as in the Arnolfini Portrait of 1434. Carpets are seen on tables in particular in Italian scenes showing the Calling of Matthew, when he was engaged in his work as a tax-collector, and the life of Saint Eligius, who was a goldsmith. Both are shown sitting doing business at a carpet-covered table or shop counter.

The Oriental carpets used in Italian Renaissance painting had various geographical origins, designated in contemporary Italy by different names: the cagiarini (Mamluk design from Egypt), the damaschini (Damascus region), the barbareschi (North Africa), the rhodioti (probably imported through Rome), the turcheschi (Ottoman Empire) and the simiscasa (Circassian or Caucasian).

Some of the prayer carpets represented in Christian religious paintings are Islamic prayer rugs, with such motifs as the mihrab or the Kaaba (the so-called re-entrant carpets, later called the "Bellini" type). The representation of such prayer rugs disappeared after 1555, probably as a consequence of the realization of their religious meaning and connection to Islam.

The depiction of Oriental carpets in paintings other than portraits generally declined after the 1540s, corresponding to a decline in the taste for highly detailed representation of objects (Detailism) among painters, and grander classicising surroundings for hieratic religious images.

== Carpet patterns named after artists ==
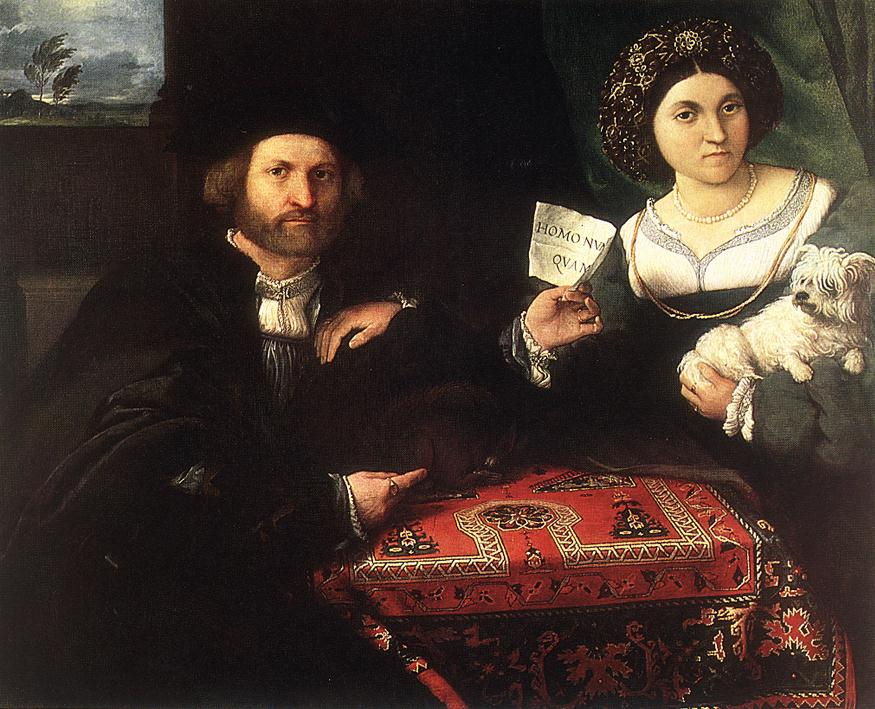
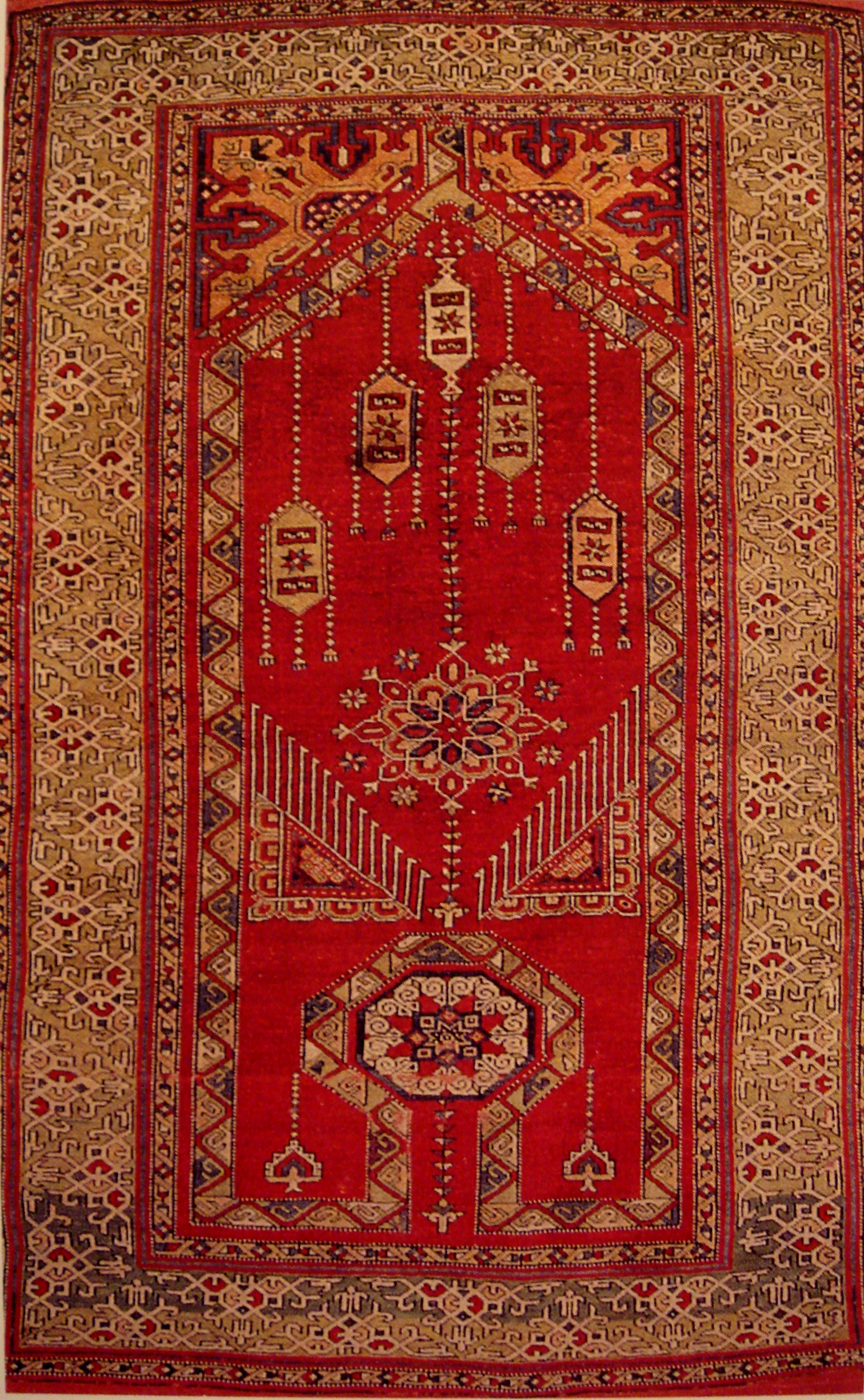
Left image: Lorenzo Lotto's Husband and Wife, 1523, with a "Bellini" carpet showing the keyhole re-entrant motif.
Right image: Re-entrant prayer rug, Anatolia, late 15th to early 16th century.
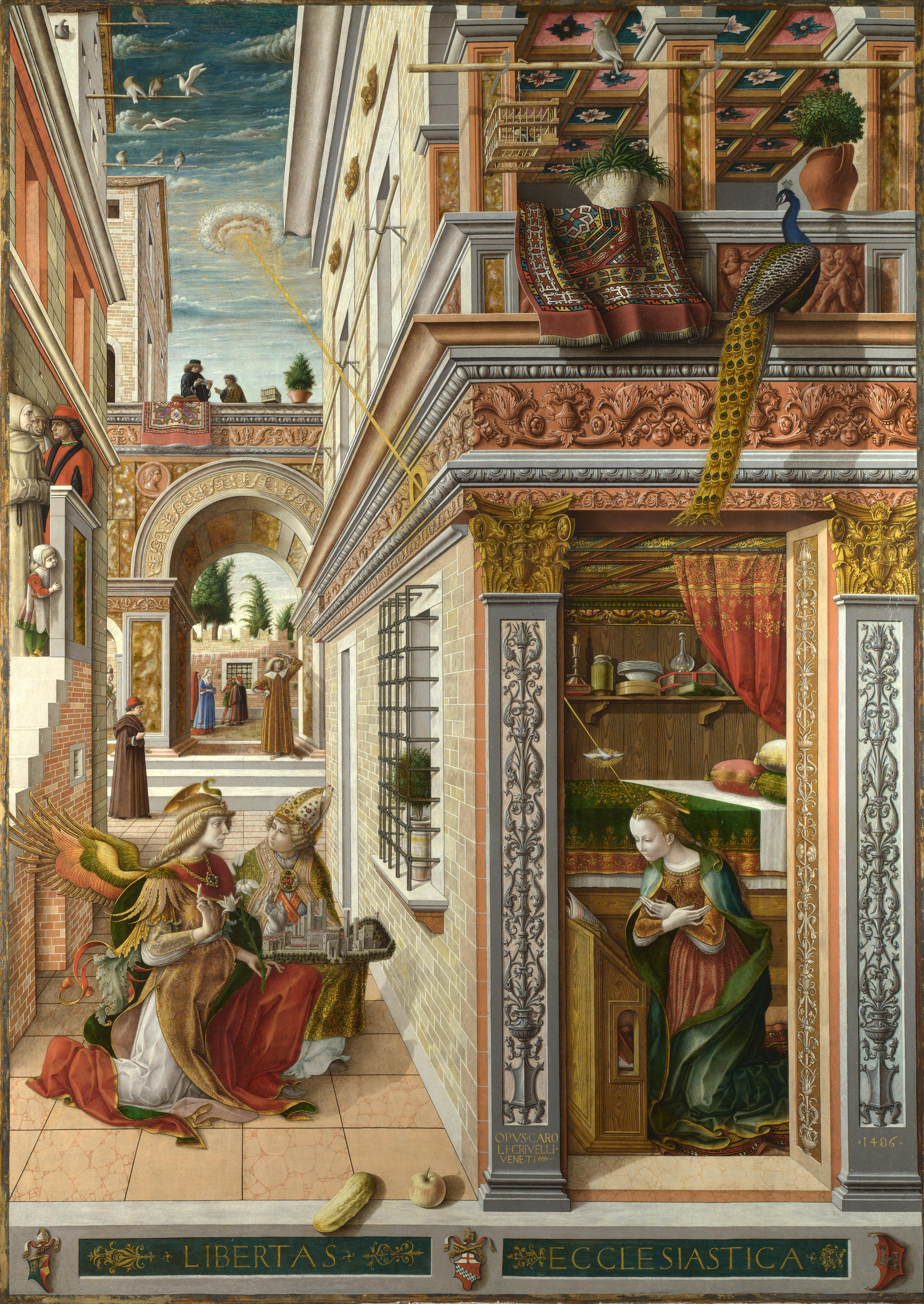
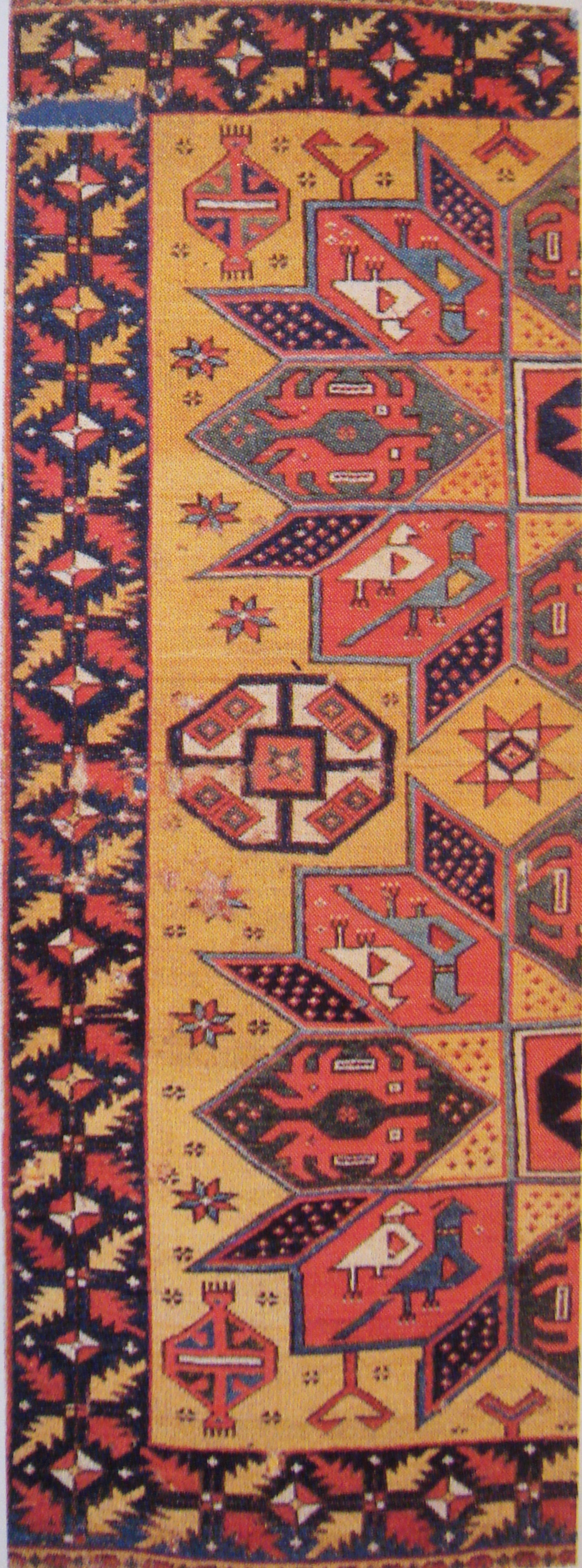
Left image: Carlo Crivelli's Annunciation with St Emidius, 1486, with Crivelli carpet in the upper left corner. See enlarged detail at left. Note that there is a second, different carpet at top center.
Right image: "Crivelli" carpet, Anatolia, late 15th-early 16th century.

When Western scholars explored the history of Islamic carpetmaking, several types of carpet pattern became conventionally called after the names of European painters who had used them, and these terms remain in use. The classification is mostly that of Kurt Erdmann, once Director of the Museum für Islamische Kunst (Berlin), and the leading carpet scholar of his day. Some of these types ceased to be produced several centuries ago, and the location of their production remains uncertain, so obvious alternative terms were not available. The classification ignores the border patterns, and distinguishes between the type, size and arrangement of gul, or larger motifs in the central field of the carpet. In addition to four types of Holbein carpets, there are Bellini carpets, Crivellis, Memlings, and Lotto carpets. These names are somewhat random: many artists painted these types, and single artists often painted many types of carpets.

=== Bellini carpets ===
Both Giovanni Bellini and his brother Gentile (who visited Istanbul in 1479) painted examples of prayer rugs with a single "re-entrant" or keyhole motif at the bottom of a larger figure traced in a thin border. At the top end the borders close diagonally to a point, from which hangs down a "lamp". The design had Islamic significance, and its function seems to have been recognised in Europe, as they were known in English as "musket" carpets, a corruption of "mosque". In the Gentile Bellini seen at top the rug is the "right" way round; often this is not the case. Later Ushak prayer rugs where both ends have the diagonal pointed inner border, as at the top only of Bellini rugs, are sometimes known as "Tintoretto" rugs, though this term is not as commonly used as the others mentioned here.

=== Crivelli carpets ===
Carlo Crivelli twice painted what seems to be the same small rug, with the centre taken up with a complex sixteen-pointed star motif made up of several compartments in different colours, some containing highly stylised animal motifs. Comparable actual carpets are extremely rare, but there are two in Budapest. The Annunciation of 1482 in the Städel museum in Frankfurt shows it at the top, and the same carpet seems to be used in the Annunciation, with Saint Emidius in the National Gallery, London (1486), which shows the type hung over a balcony to the top left, and a different type of carpet over another balcony in the right foreground. These seem to be a transitional type between the early animal-pattern carpets and later purely geometrical designs, such as the Holbein types, perhaps reflecting increased Ottoman enforcement of Islamic aniconism.

=== Memling carpets ===
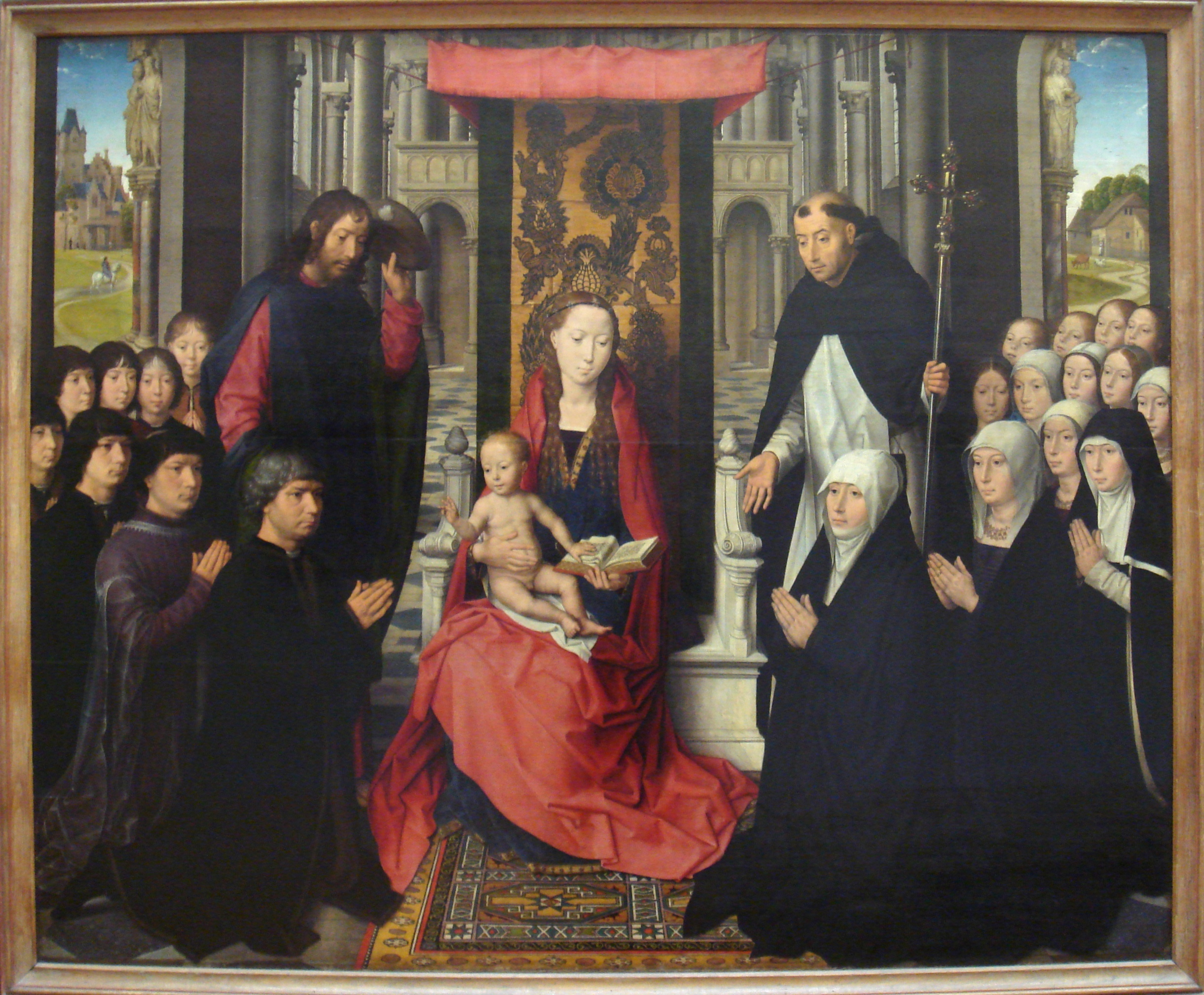
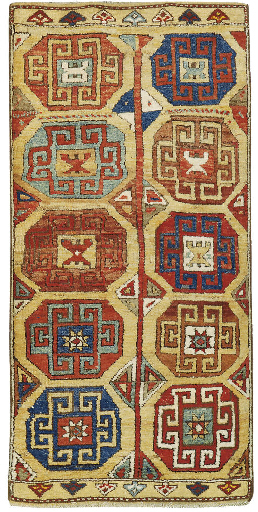
Left image: yellow Oriental carpet in Hans Memling altarpiece of 1488–1490. The "hooked" motif defines a "Memling carpet". Louvre Museum.
Right image: Konya 18th century carpet with Memling gul design.

These are named after Hans Memling, who painted several examples of what may have been Armenian carpets in the last quarter of the fifteenth century, and are characterised by several lines coming off the motifs that end in "hooks", by coiling in on themselves through two or three 90° turns. Another example appears in a miniature painted for René of Anjou about 1460.

=== Holbein carpets ===
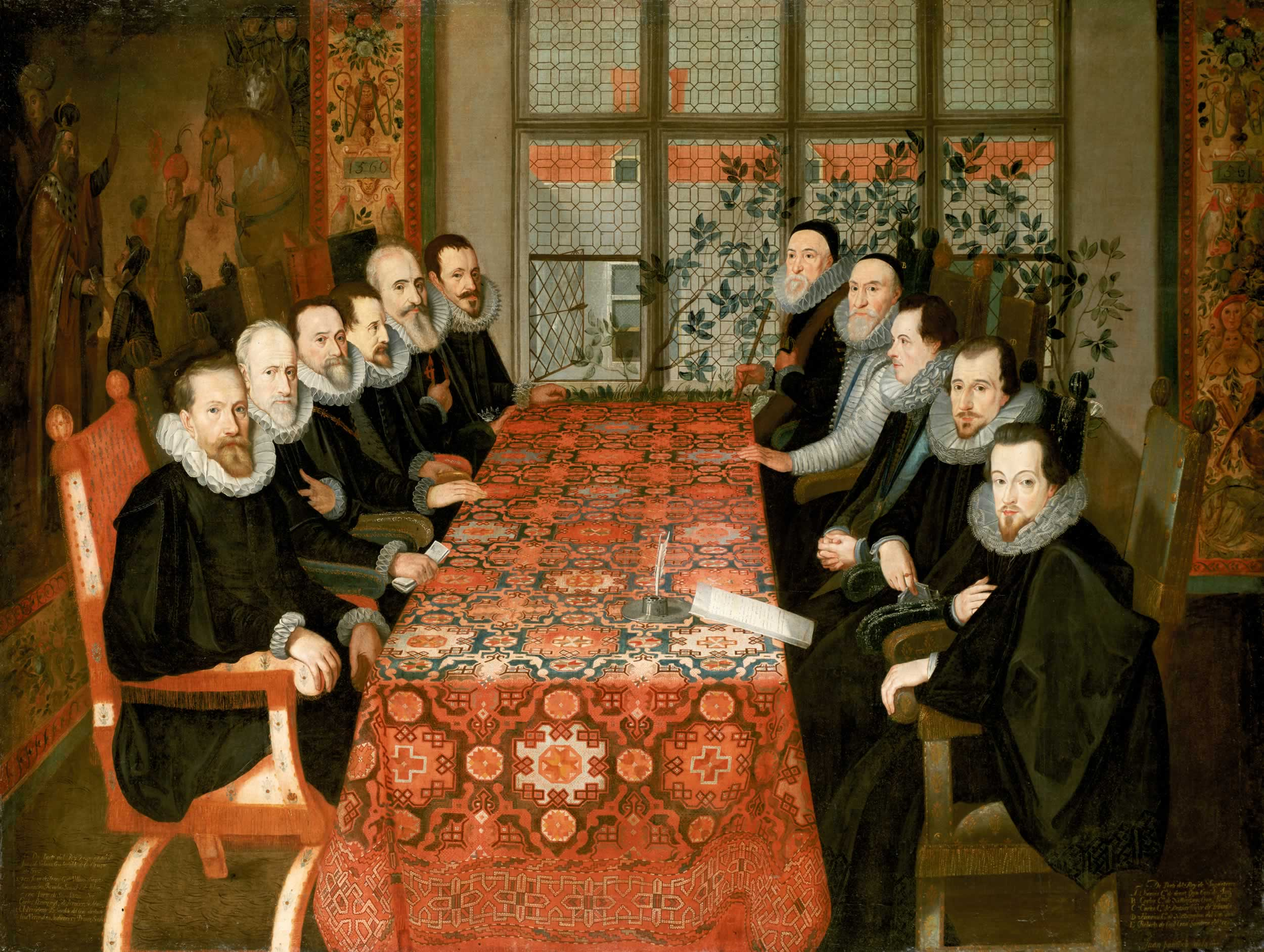
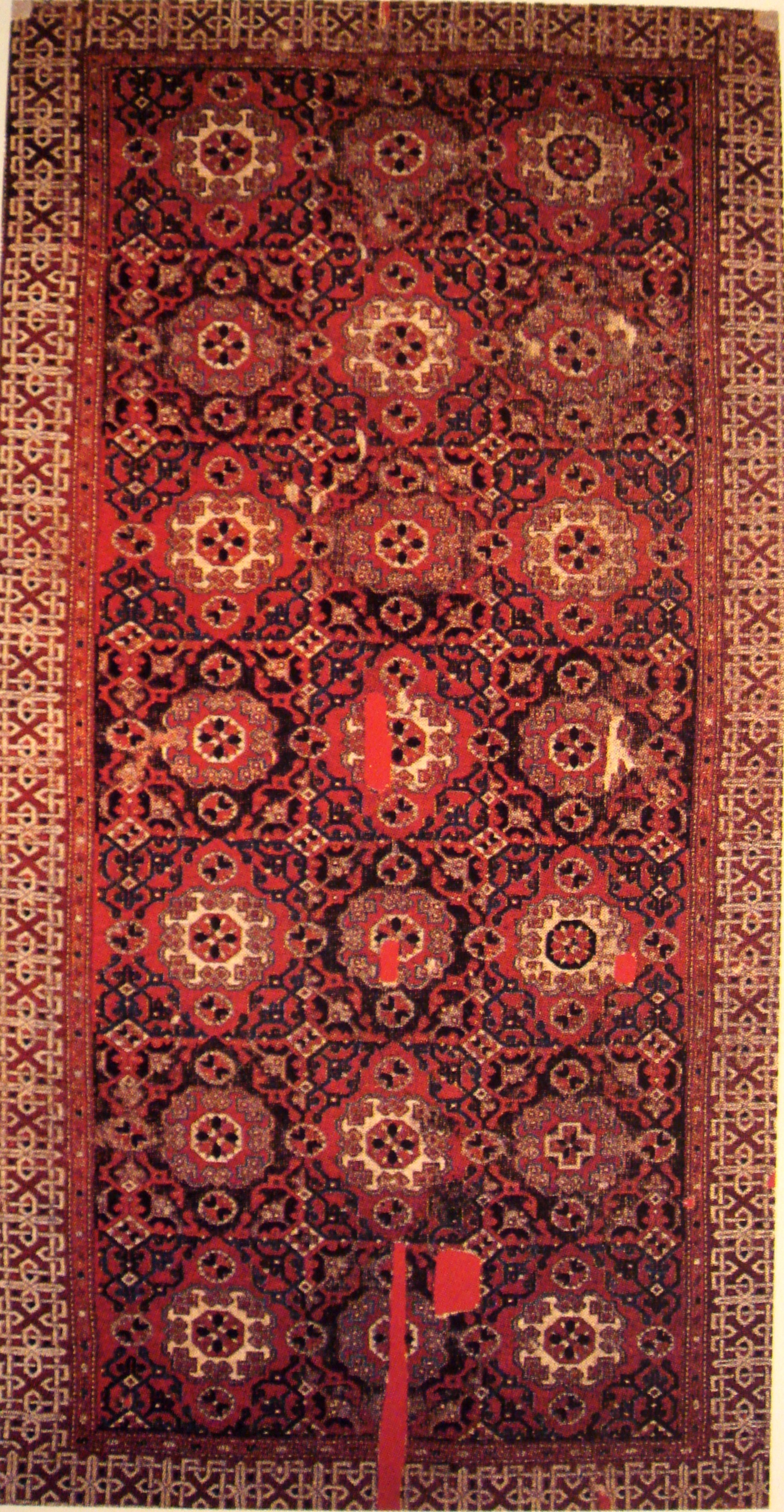
Left image: Unknown painter, The Somerset House Conference, with a small-pattern Holbein carpet.
Right image: Small-pattern Holbein carpet, Anatolia, 16th century.

These in fact are seen in paintings from many decades earlier than Holbein, and are sub-divided into four types (of which Holbein actually only painted two); they are the commonest designs of Anatolian rug seen in Western Renaissance paintings, and continued to be produced for a long period. All are purely geometric and use a variety of arrangements of lozenges, crosses and octagonal motifs within the main field. The sub-divisions are between:

- Type I: Small-pattern Holbein. This type is defined by an infinite repeat of small patterns, with alternating rows of octagons and staggered rows of diamonds, as seen in Holbein the Younger's Portrait of Georg Gisze (1532), or the Somerset House Conference (1608).
- Type II: now more often called Lotto carpets - see below.
- Type III: Large-pattern Holbein. The motifs in the field inside the border consist of one or two large squares filled with octagons, placed regularly, and separated from each other and from the borders by narrow stripes. There are no secondary "gul" motifs. The carpet in Holbein's The Ambassadors is of this type.
- Type IV: Large-pattern Holbein. Large, square, star-filled compartments are combined with secondary, smaller squares containing octagons or other "gul" motifs. In contrast to the other types, which only contain patterns of equal scale, the type IV Holbein shows subordinate ornaments of unequal scale.

=== Lotto carpets ===
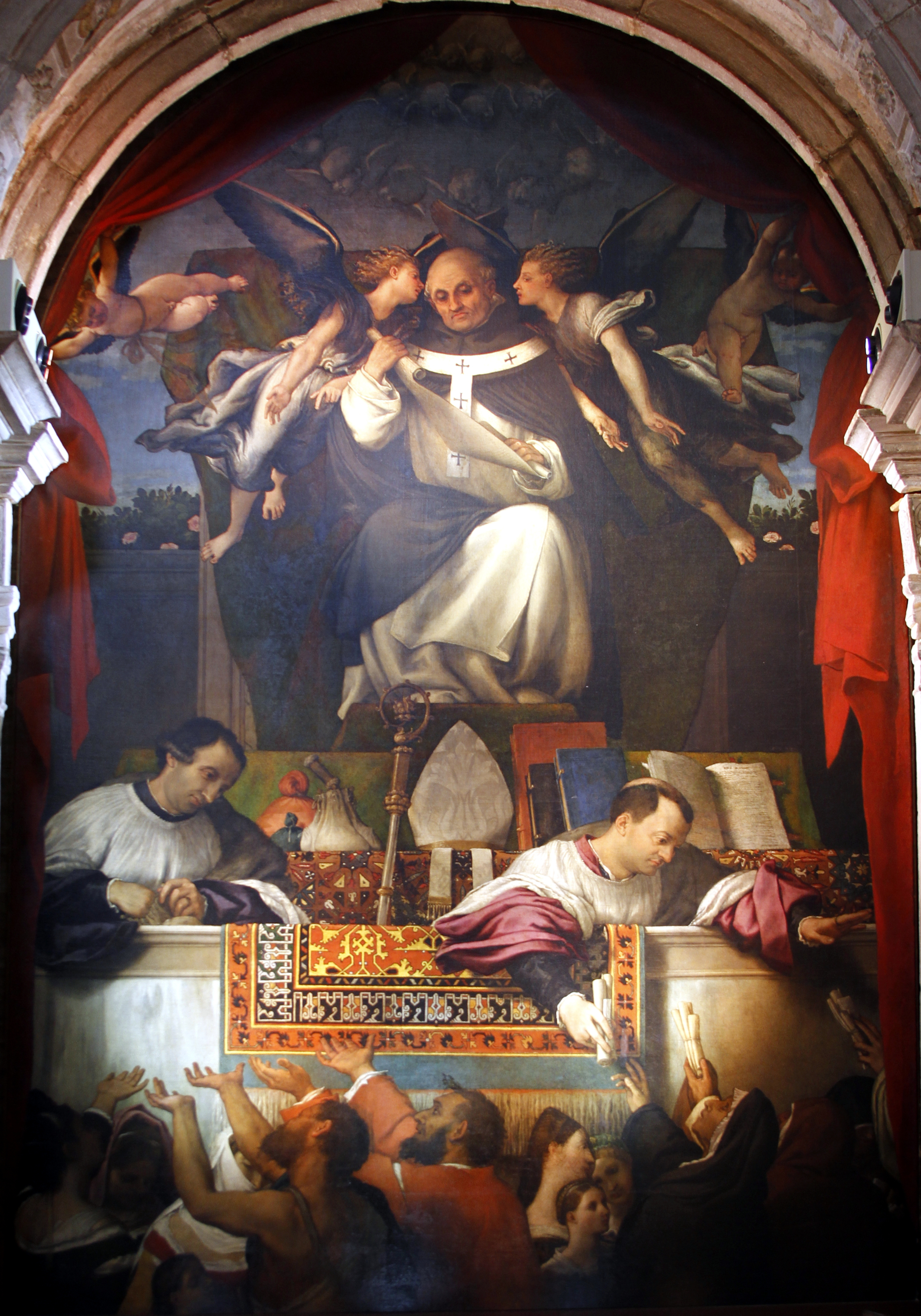
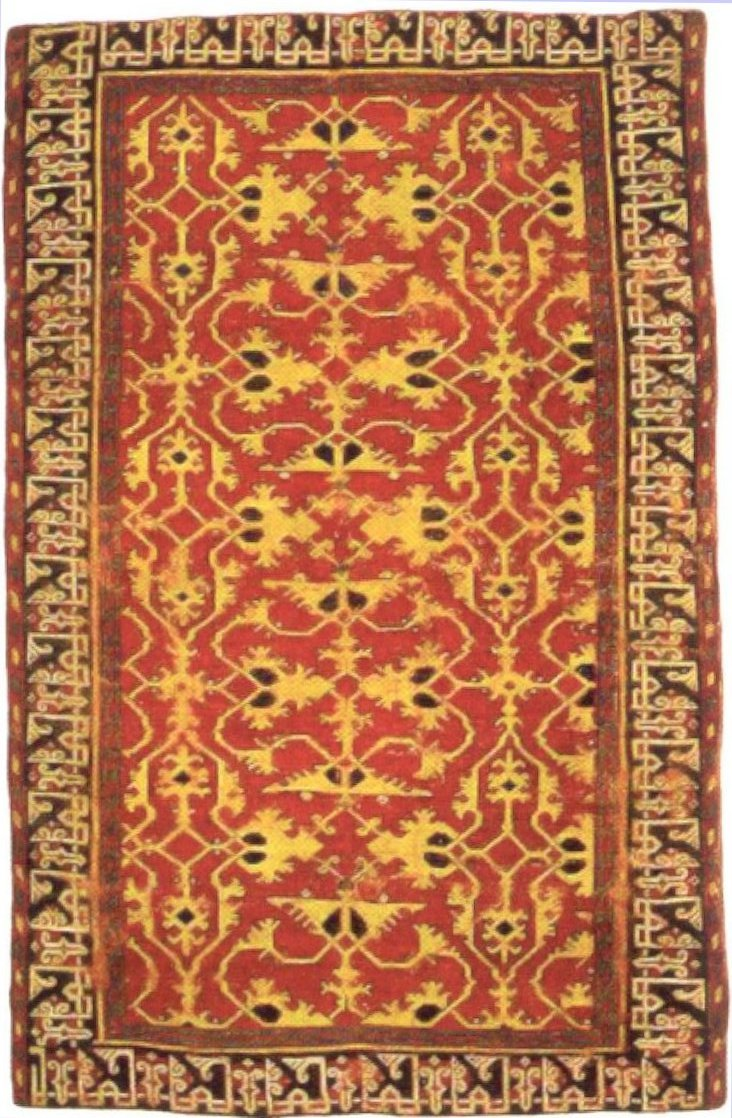
Left image: The Alms of St. Anthony by Lorenzo Lotto, 1542, with two magnificent Oriental carpets, the one in the foreground the type for the Lotto carpet, the other a "para-Mamluk".
Right image: Western Anatolia knotted wool "Lotto carpet", 16th century, Saint Louis Art Museum.

These were previously known as "small-pattern Holbein Type II", but he never painted one, unlike Lorenzo Lotto, who did so several times, though he was not the first artist to show them. Lotto is also documented as owning a large carpet, though its pattern is unknown. They were primarily produced during the 16th and 17th centuries along the Aegean coast of Anatolia, but also copied in various parts of Europe, including Spain, England and Italy. They are characterized by a lacy arabesque, usually in yellow on a red ground, often with blue details.

Though they look very different from Holbein Type I carpets, they are a development of the type, where the edges of the motifs, nearly always in yellow on a red ground, take off in rigid arabesques somewhat suggesting foliage, and terminating in branched palmettes. The type was common and long-lasting, and is also known as "Arabesque Ushak".

To judge from paintings, they reached Italy by 1516, Portugal about a decade later, and northern Europe, including England, by the 1560s. They continue to appear in paintings until about the 1660s, especially in the Netherlands.

=== Ghirlandaio carpets ===
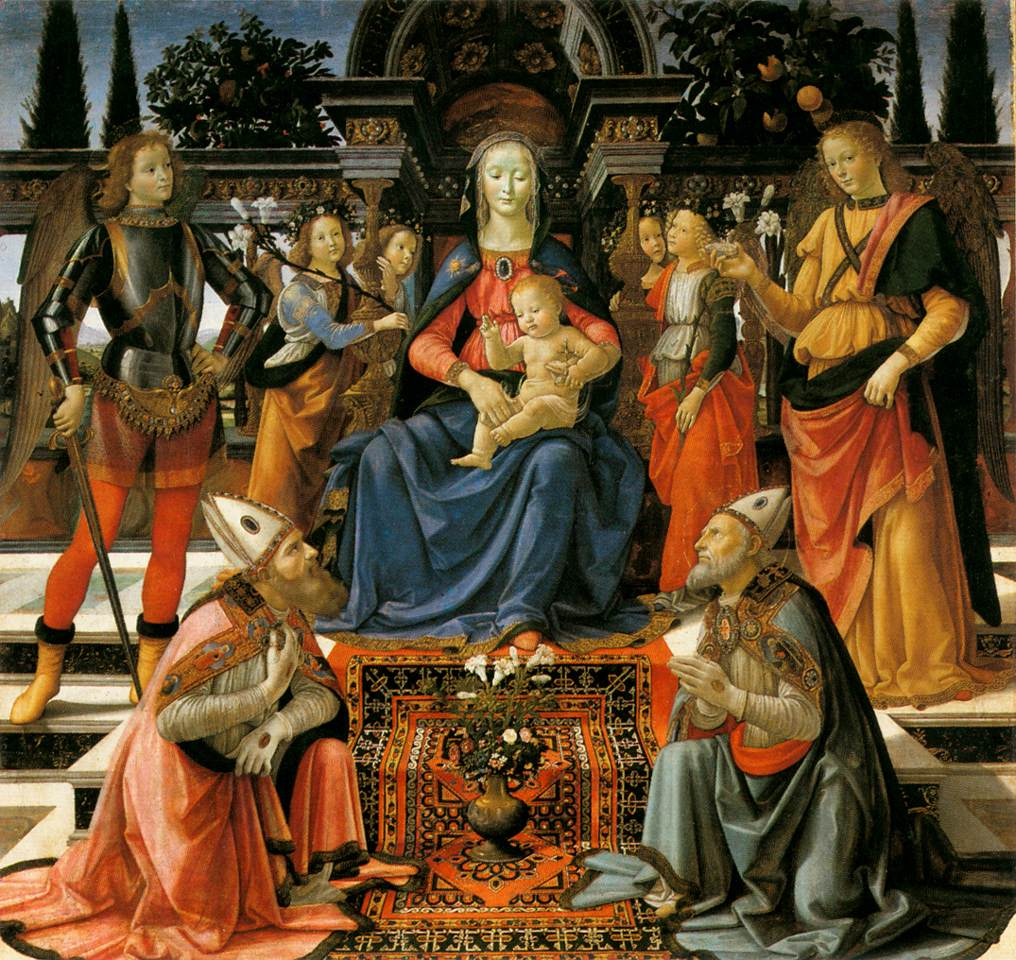
Domenico Ghirlandaio: Madonna and Child enthroned with Saint, circa 1483

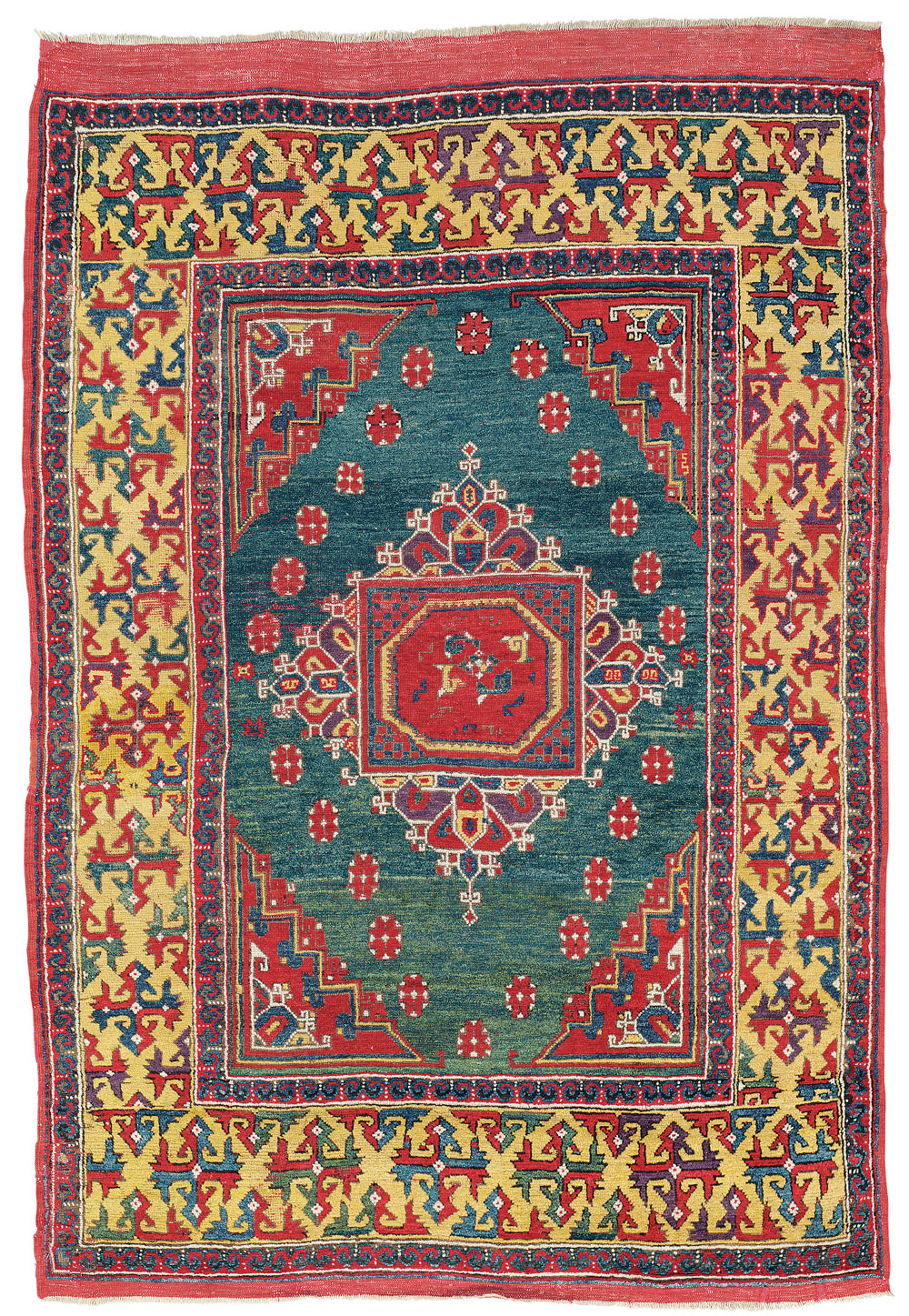
West Anatolian ‘Ghirlandaio’ rug, late 17th century

A carpet closely related to the 1483 painting by Domenico Ghirlandaio was found by A. Boralevi in the Evangelical church, Hâlchiu (Heldsdorf) in Transylvania, attributed to Western Anatolia, and dated to the late 15th century.

The general design of the Ghirlandaio type, as in the 1486 painting, is related to Holbein Type 1. It is defined by one or two central medallions of diamond shape, consisting of an octagon within a square, from whose sides triangular, curvilinear patterns arise. Carpets with this medallion have been woven in the Western Anatolian region of Çanakkale since the 16th century. A carpet fragment with a Ghirlandaio medallion was found in the Divriği Great Mosque, and dated to the 16th century. Carpets with similar medallions were dated to the 17th, 18th and 19th century, respectively, and are still woven in the Çanakkale region today.

In his essay on "Centralized Designs", Thompson relates the central medallion pattern of oriental carpets to the "lotus pedestal" and "cloud collar (yun chien)" motifs, used in the art of Buddhist Asia. The origin of the design thus dates back to pre-Islamic times, probably Yuan time China. Brüggemann and Boehmer further elaborate that it might have been introduced to Western Anatolia by the Seljuk, or Mongol invaders in the 11th or 13th century. In contrast to the manifold variation of patterns seen in other carpet types, the Ghirlandaio medallion design has remained largely unaltered from the 15th to the 21st century, and thus exemplifies an unusual continuity of a woven carpet design within a specific region.

=== Van Eyck and Petrus Christus: Painted carpets without surviving counterparts ===
The Netherlandish painters Jan van Eyck, in his Paele Madonna, Lucca Madonna, and the Dresden Triptych, and Petrus Christus in his Virgin and Child Enthroned with Saints Jerome and Francis have painted four different carpets, three of them of a similar design. By the realism of the depictions, these are pile-woven carpets. No directly comparable carpets have survived.

The carpet pattern depicted on van Eyck's Paele Madonna could be traced back to late Roman origins and related to early Islamic floor mosaics found in the Umayyad palace of Khirbat al-Mafjar.

Similar, but not identical carpets appear in the Lucca Madonna, Dresden triptych, and Virgin and Child with Saints paintings which show a predominantly geometric design with a lozenge composition in infinite repeat, built up from fine bands which connect eight-pointed stars. Yetkin has identified an Anatolian carpet with a similar, but more advanced lozenge design (Yetkin, 1981, plate 47 in the Mevlana Museum, Konya, dated to the 17th century. She relates these carpets to 19th century Caucasian "Dragon" rugs with a similar lozenge design (p. 71), and claims that carpets of a type as depicted by van Eyck and Petrus Christus are early Anatolian forerunners to the later Caucasian design.

The main borders of the carpets in the Paele and Lucca Madonna, as well as in Virgin and Child with Saints however, each show a non-Oriental undulating trefoil stem. Similar ornaments can be found in the borders of many carpets in Early Netherlandish paintings from the 15th to the beginning of the 16th century. The fringes of these carpets are often found at the sides of the painted carpets, not at the upper and lower ends. Either did the carpets have an uncommonly square shape, or maybe the artists have used some license and improvised with the authentic models. Alternatively, the carpets depicted by van Eyck and Petrus Christus could be of Western European manufacture. The undulating trefoil design is a well-known feature of Western Gothic ornament.

== Specific carpet types ==
=== Mamluk and Ottoman Cairene carpets ===
From the middle of the 15th century onwards, a type of carpet was produced in Egypt which is characterized by a dominant central medallion, or three to five medallions in a row along the vertical axis. Numerous smaller ornaments are placed around the medallions, such as eight-pointed stars, or small ornaments composed of stylized floral elements. The innumerable small geometric and floral ornaments give a kaleidoscopic impression. Sixty of these carpets were given to the English cardinal Thomas Wolsey in exchange for a license for Venetian merchants to import wine to England. The earliest known painting representing a Mamluk carpet is Giovanni Bellinis Portrait of the Doge of Venice Loredan and his four advisers from 1507. A French master depicted The Three De Coligny brothers in 1555. Another representation can be found on Ambrosius Frankens The Last Supper, about 1570. The large medallion is depicted in a way that it forms the nimbus of the head of Christ. The characteristic Mamluk carpet ornaments are clearly visible. Ydema has documented a total of sixteen dateable representations of Mamluk carpets.

After the 1517 Ottoman conquest of the Mamluk Sultanate in Egypt, two different cultures merged, as is seen on Mamluk carpets woven after this date. After the conquest of Egypt, the Cairene weavers adopted an Ottoman Turkish design. The production of these carpets continued in Egypt into the early 17th century. A carpet of the Ottoman Cairene type is depicted in Ludovicus Finsonius' painting The Annunciation. Its border design and guard borders are the same as a carpet in the Rijksmuseum, Amsterdam. A similar carpet has been depicted by Adriaen van der Venne in Geckie met de Kous, 1630. Peter Paul Rubens and Jan Brueghel the Elders Christ in the House of Mary and Martha, 1628, shows the characteristic S-stems ending in double sickle-shaped lancet leaves. Various carpets of the Ottoman Cairene type are depicted in Moretto da Brescias frescoes in the "Sala delle Dame" at the Palazzo Salvadego in Brescia, Italy.

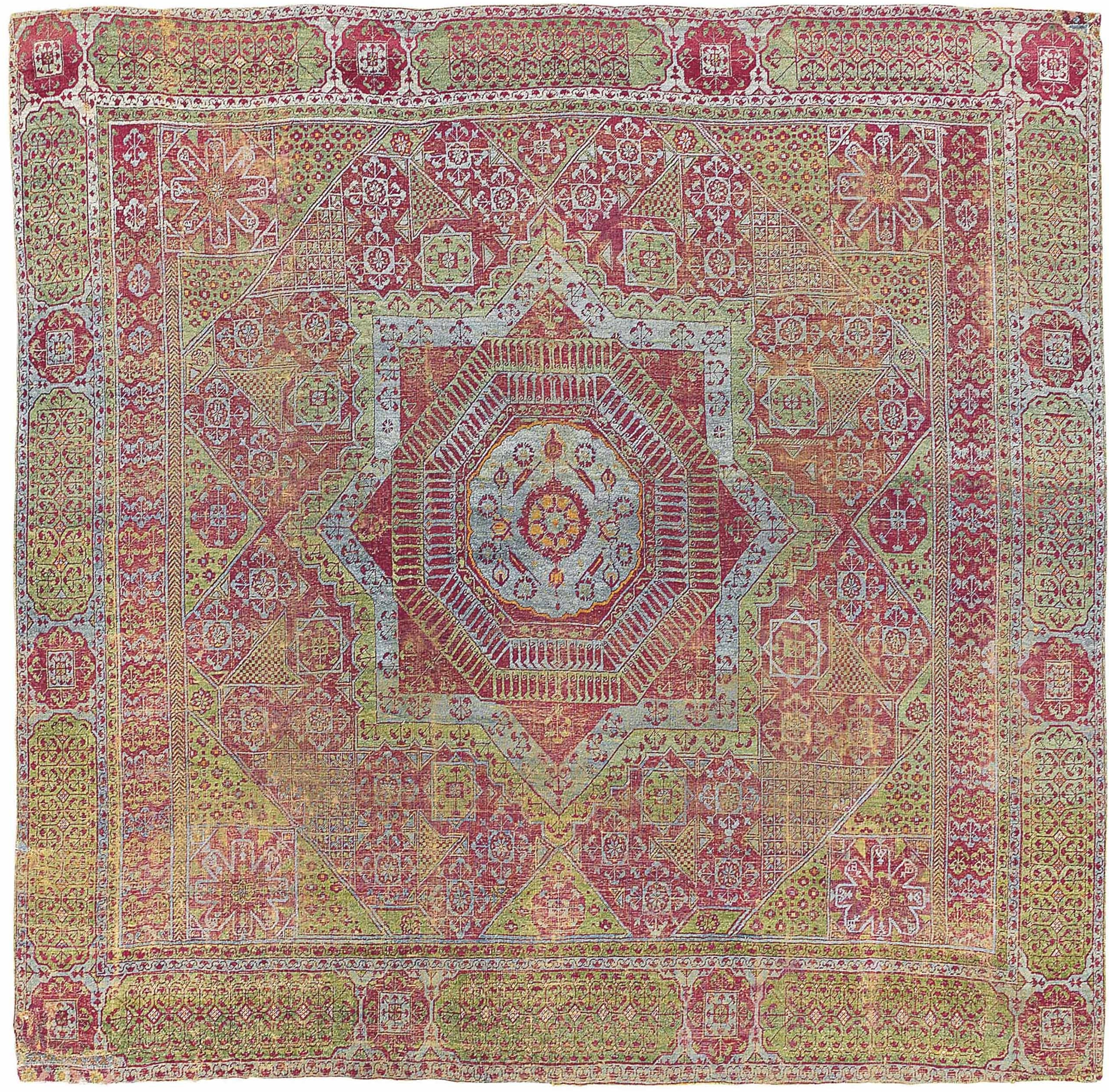
The "Baillet-Latour" Mamluk carpet, Cairo, early 16th century

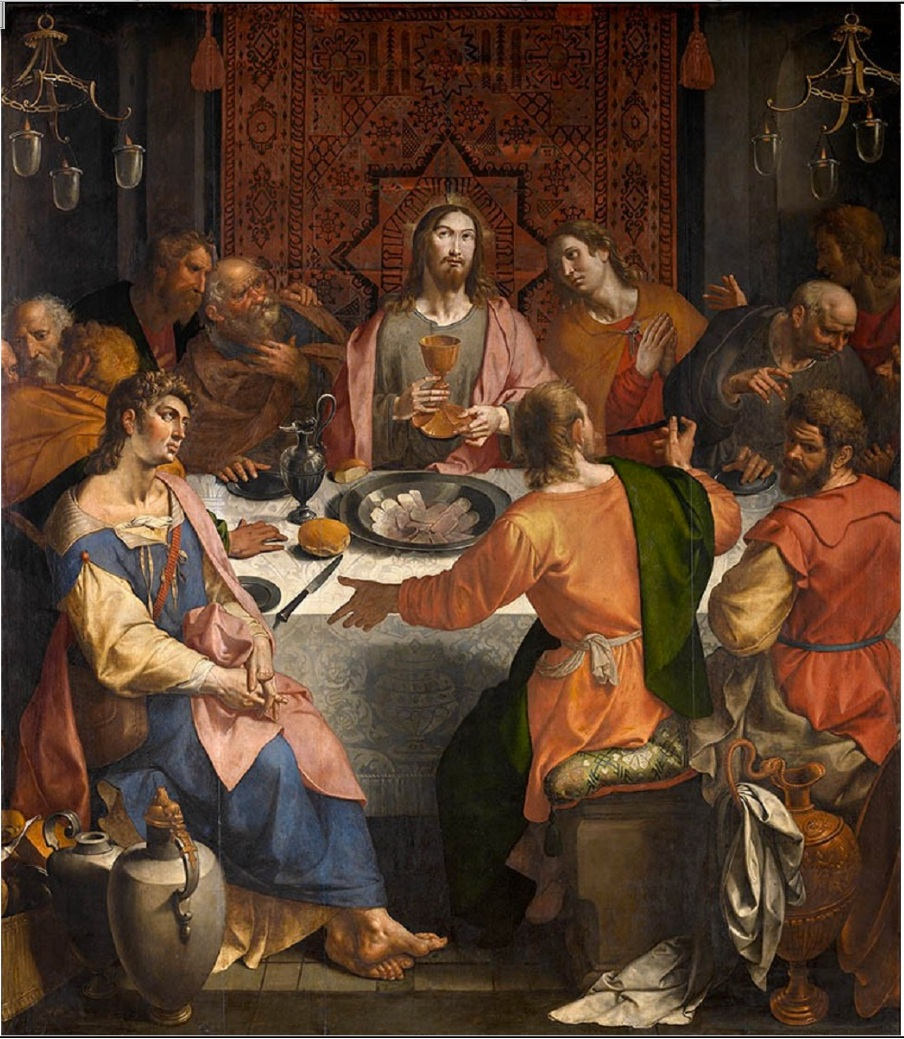
Ambrosius Francken, The Last Supper, 16th century, Royal Museum of Fine Arts Antwerp, with an Egyptian Mamluk carpet

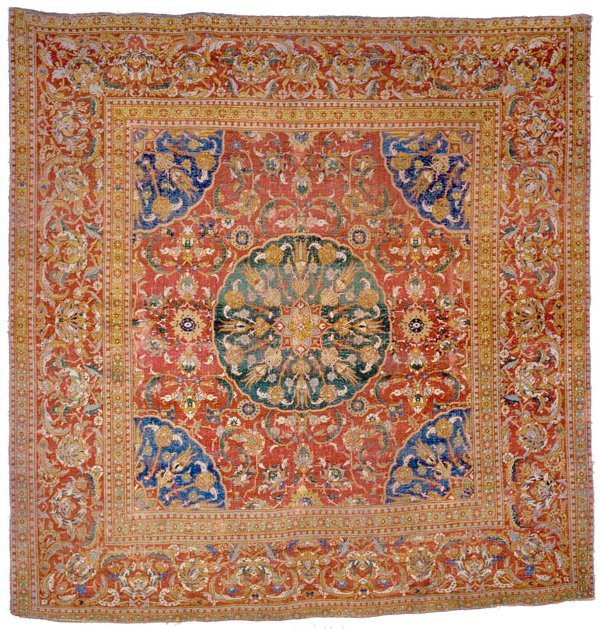
Ottoman carpet. Probably Cairo, Egypt. First half of the 17th century

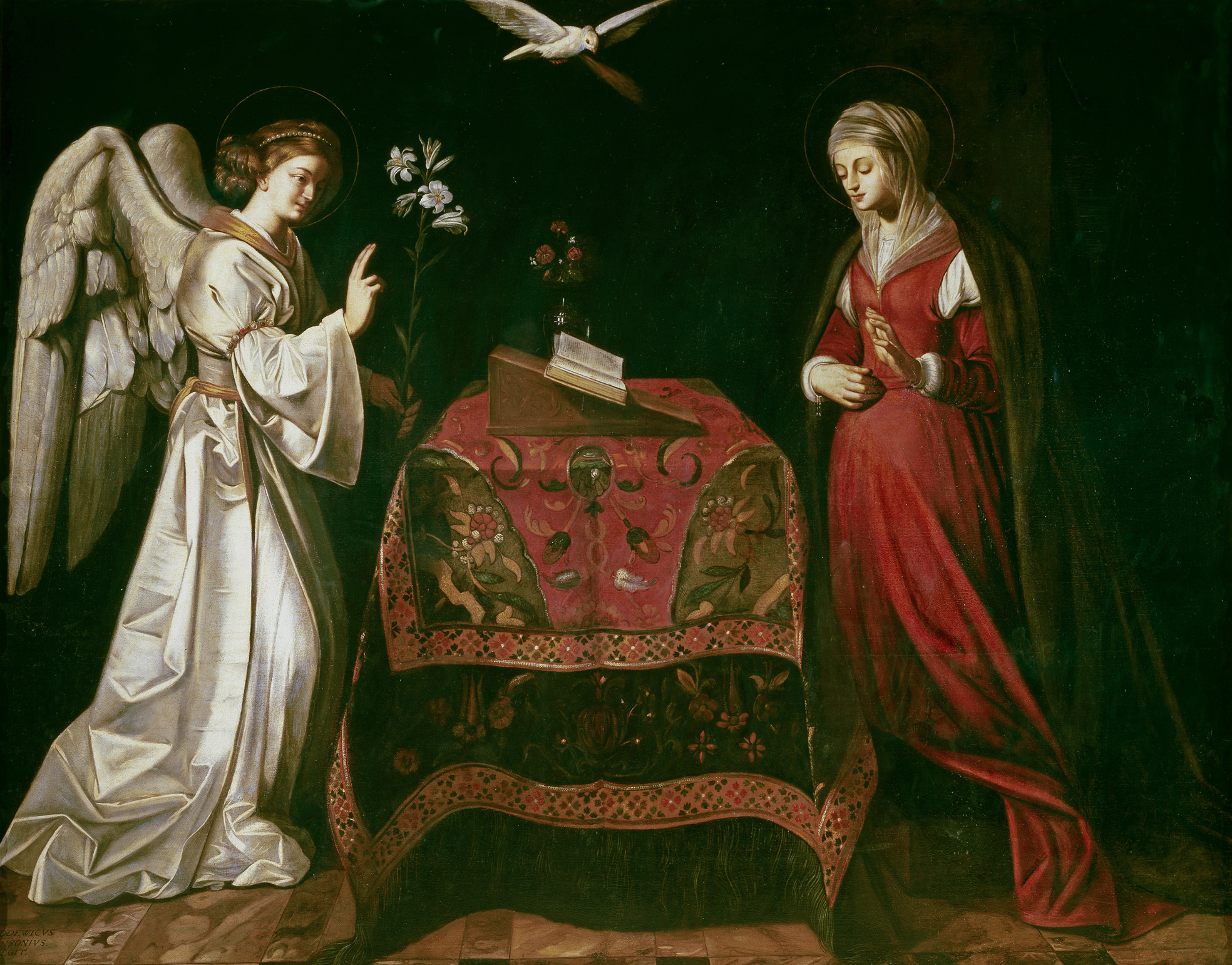
Louis Finson, The Annunciation. 17th century, Museo del Prado, depicting an Ottoman Cairene carpet

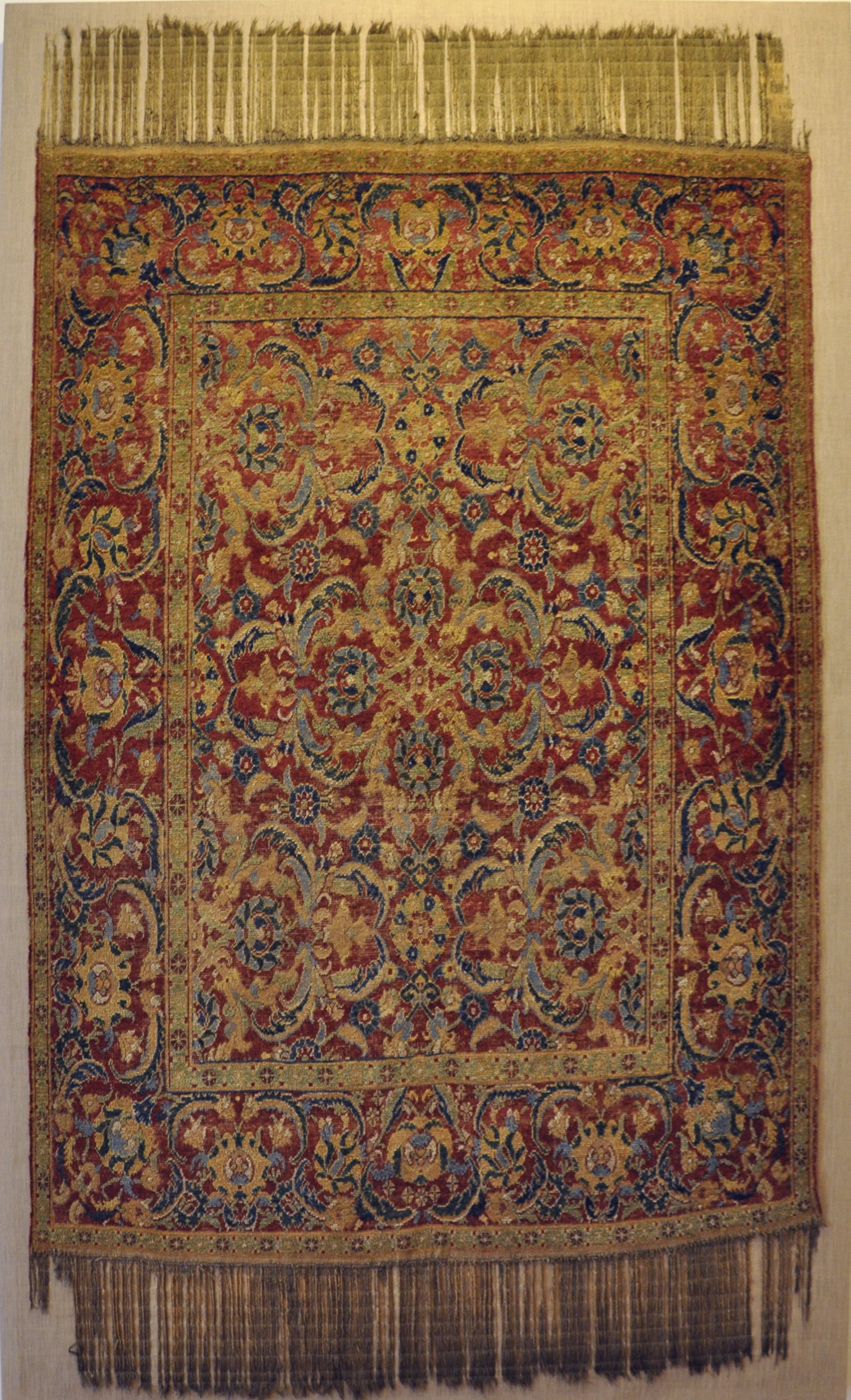
Ottoman Cairene carpet, 16th century, Museum für angewandte Kunst Frankfurt St. 136

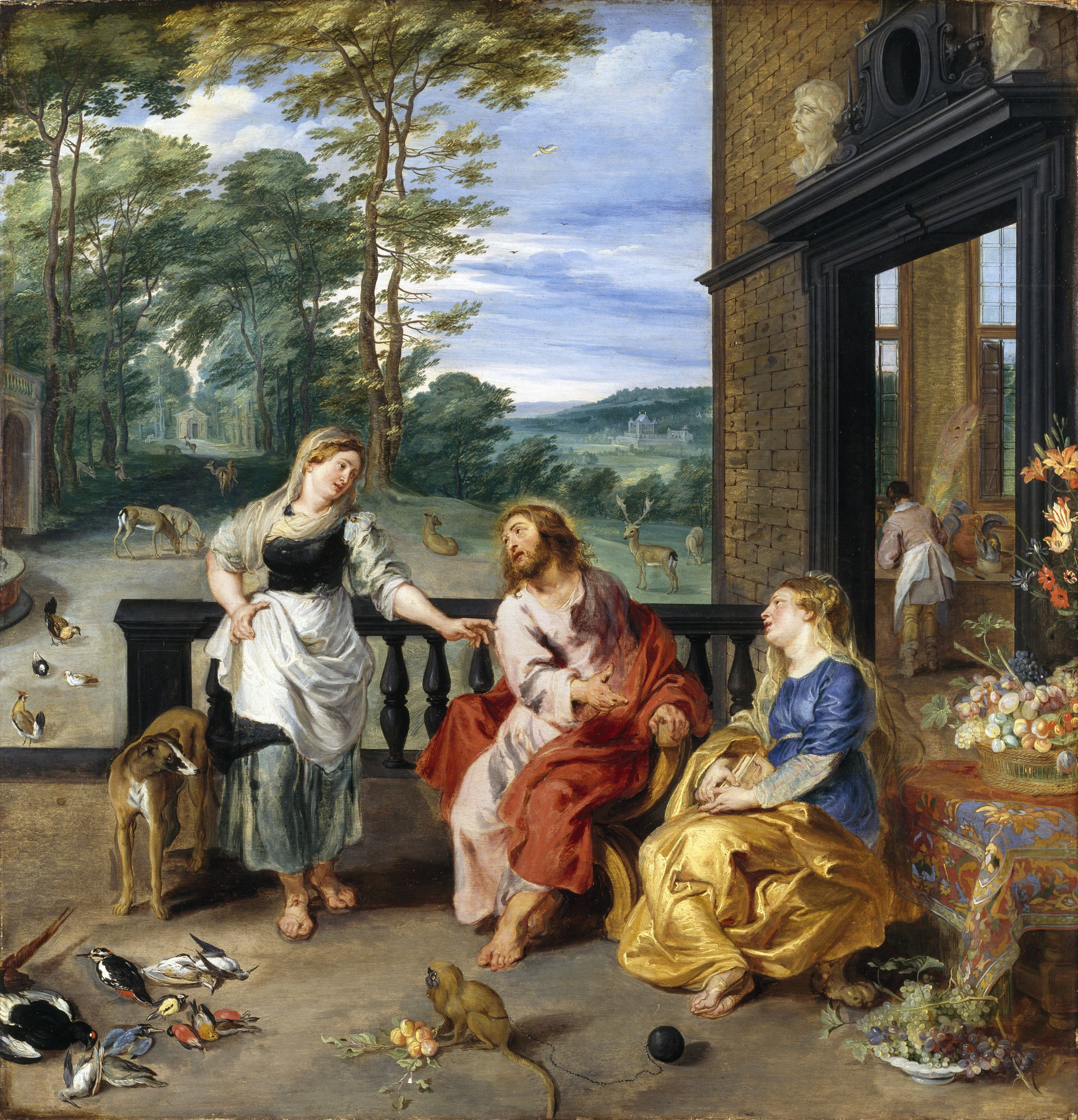
Christ in the House of Martha and Mary, 1628, Jan Bruegel and Peter Paul Rubens, National Gallery of Ireland, depicting an Ottoman Cairene carpet.

=== "Chequerboard" or Compartment carpets from the 17th century ===
An extremely rare group of carpets, "chequerboard" carpets were assumed to be a later and derivative continuum of the Mamluk and Ottoman Cairene group of carpets. Only about 30 of these carpets survived. They are distinguished by their design composed of rows of squares with triangles in each corner enclosing a star pattern. All "chequerboard" carpets have borders with cartouches and lobed medallions. Their attribution is still under debate. The colours and patterns resemble those seen in Mamluk carpets; however, they are "S-spun" and "Z-twisted" and thus similar to early Armenian carpets. Since the early days of carpet science they are attributed to Damascus. Pinner and Franses champion this attribution because Syria was part first of the Mamluk, later of the Ottoman Empire at that time. This would explain the similarities with the colours and patterns of the Cairene carpets. The current dating of the "chequerboard" carpets is also consistent with European collection inventories from the early 17th century. Carpets of the "chequerboard" type are depicted on Pietro Paolinis (1603−1681) Self portrait, as well as on Gabriël Metsus painting The musical party.

=== Large Ushak (star and medallion) carpets ===
In contrast to the relatively large number of surviving carpets of this type, relatively few of them are represented in Renaissance paintings.

Star Ushak carpets were often woven in large formats. As such, they represent a typical product of higher organized, town manufacture. They are characterized by large dark blue star shaped primary medallions in infinite repeat on a red ground field containing a secondary floral scroll. The design was likely influenced by northwest Persian book design, or by Persian carpet medallions. As compared to the medallion Ushak carpets, the concept of the infinite repeat in star Ushak carpets is more accentuated and in keeping with the early Turkish design tradition. Because of their strong allusion to the infinite repeat, the star Ushak design can be used on carpets of various size and in many varying dimensions.

Medallion Ushak carpets usually have a red or blue field decorated with a floral trellis or leaf tendrils, ovoid primary medallions alternating with smaller eight-lobed stars, or lobed medallions, intertwined with floral tracery. Their border frequently contains palmettes on a floral and leaf scroll, and pseudo-kufic characters.

The best known representation of a Medallion Ushak was painted in 1656 by Vermeer in his painting The Procuress. It is placed horizontally; the upper or lower end with the star-shaped corner medallion can be seen. Under the woman's hand which holds the glass, a part of a characteristic Ushak medallion can be seen. The carpet seen on Vermeer's The Music Lesson, Girl Reading a Letter at an Open Window, and The Concert hardly show any differences in the details of the design or the weaving structure indicate that all three pictures might trace back to one single carpet Vermeer might have had at his studio. The paintings by Vermeer, Steen, and Verkolje depict a special type of Ushak carpet of which no surviving counterpart is known. It is characterized by its rather sombre colours, coarse weaving, and patterns with a more degenerated curvilinear design.

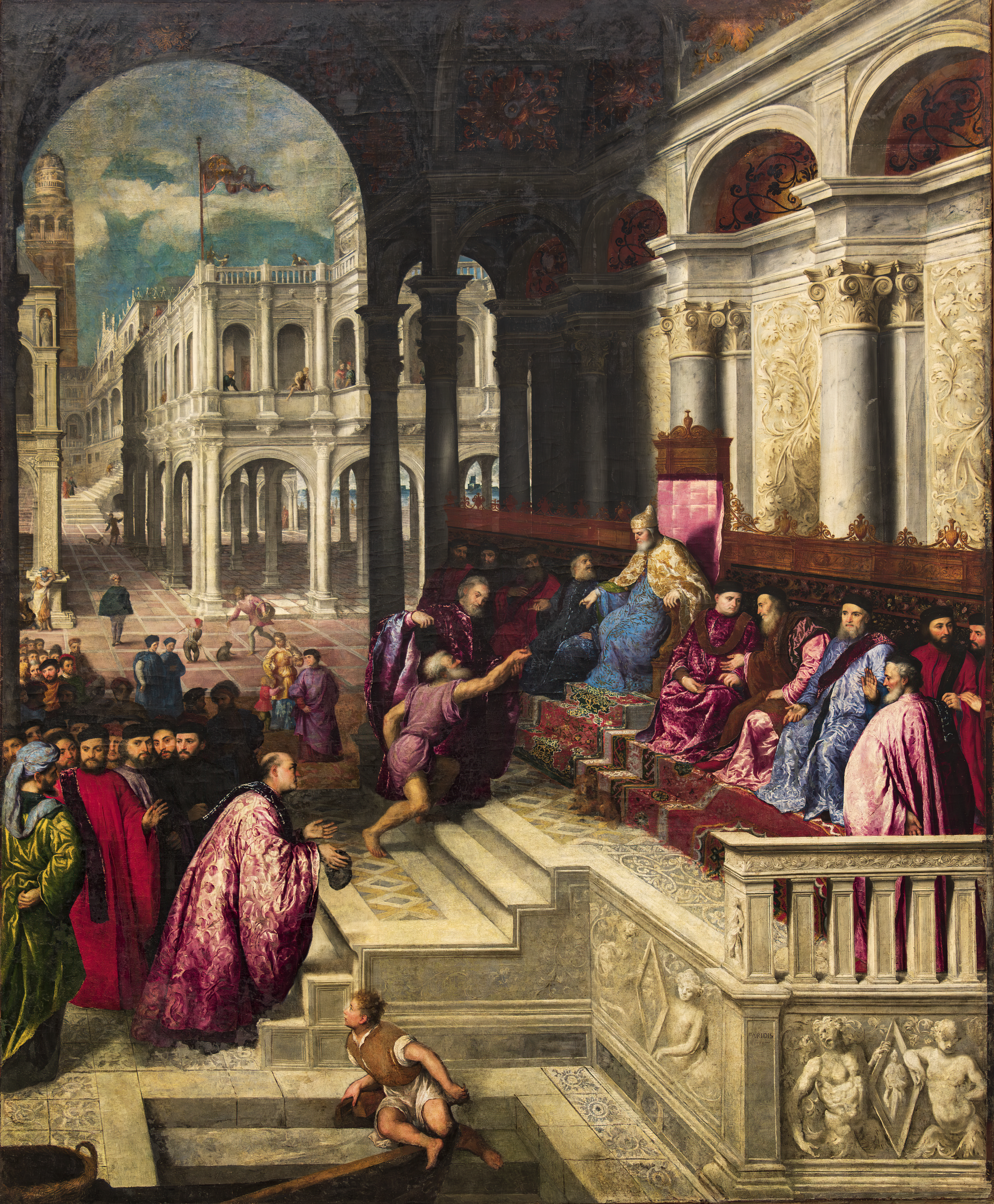
Paris Bordone, Presentation of the ring to the Doge of Venice, 1534. The only depiction of a large Star Ushak carpet with eight-pointed star medallions.

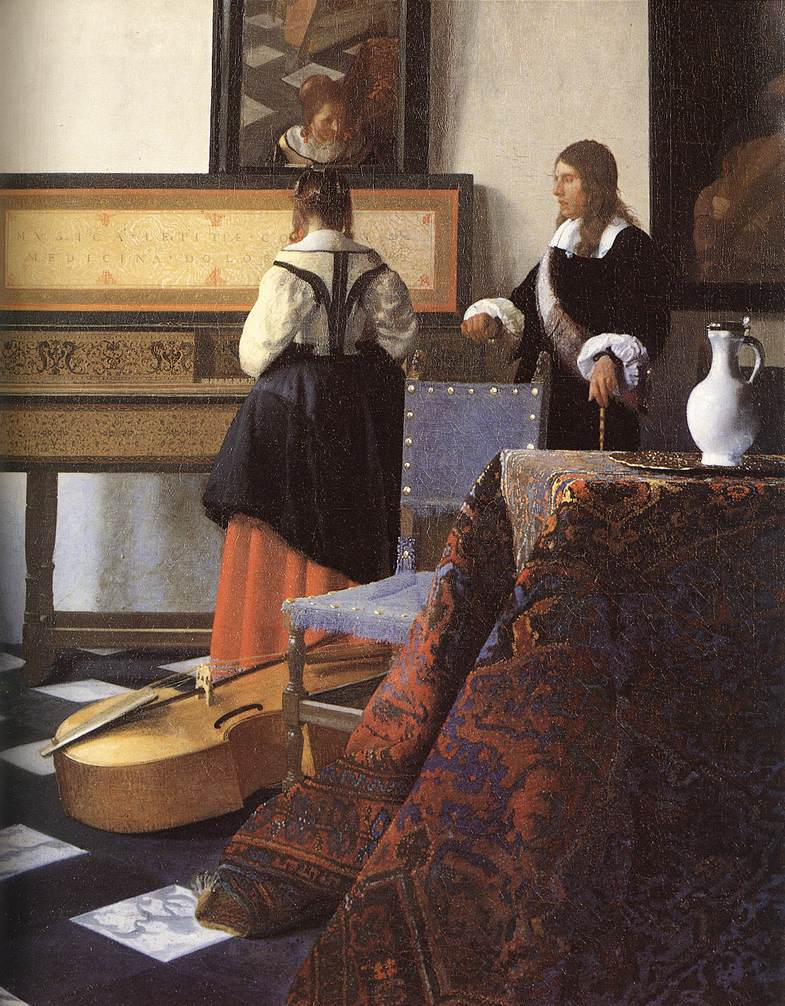
Johannes Vermeer, The Music Lesson (detail), 1662–5, Buckingham Palace

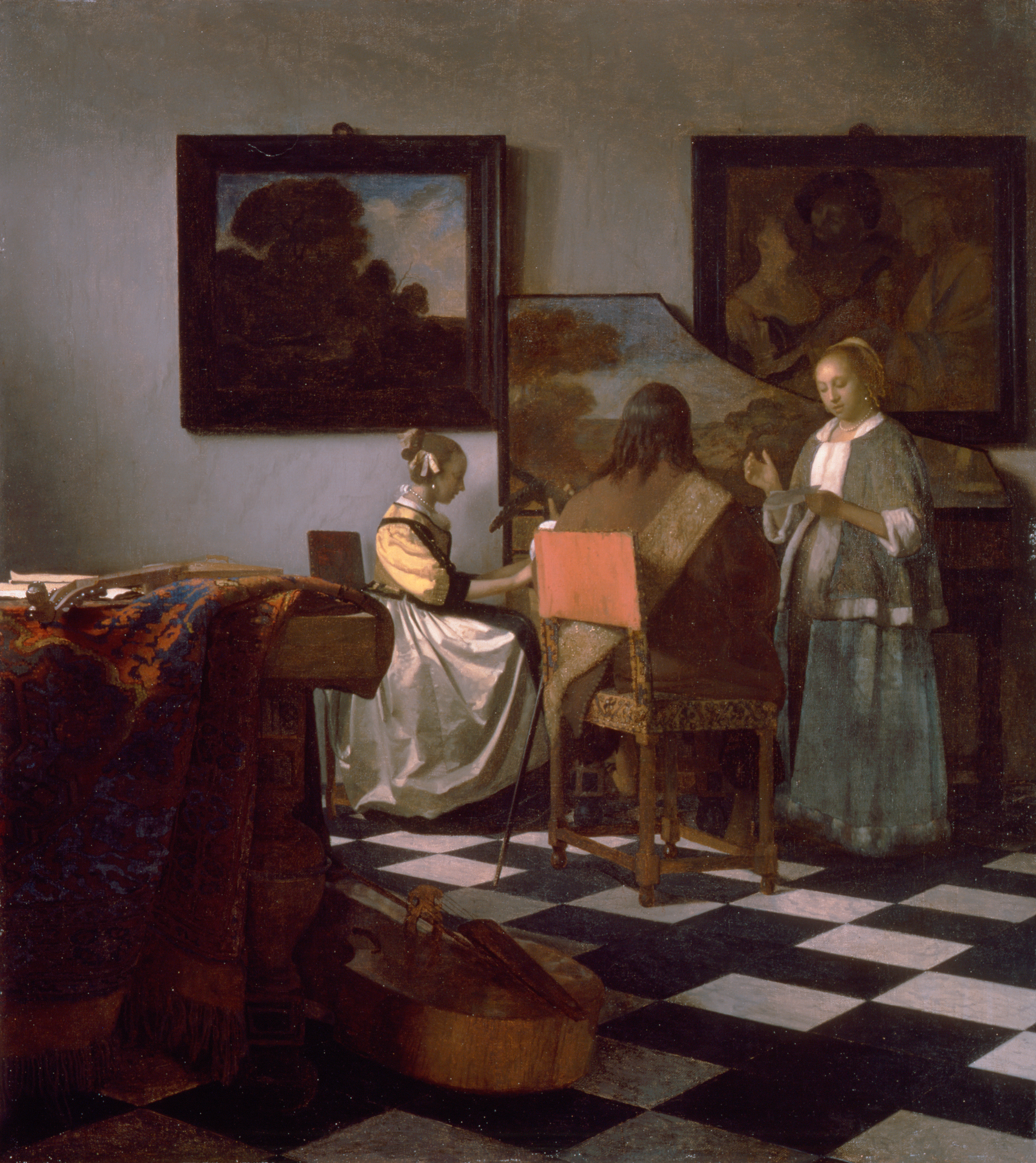
Johannes Vermeer, The Concert, 1663–6, stolen from the Isabella Stewart Gardner Museum, Boston, in 1990

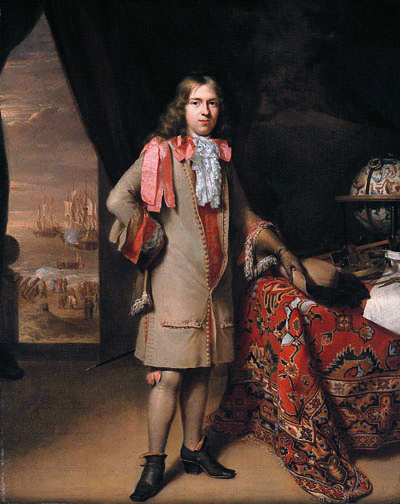
Jan and Nikolaas Verkolje, Portrait of Willem de Vlamingh, 1690–1700

=== Persian and Anatolian carpets in the 17th century ===
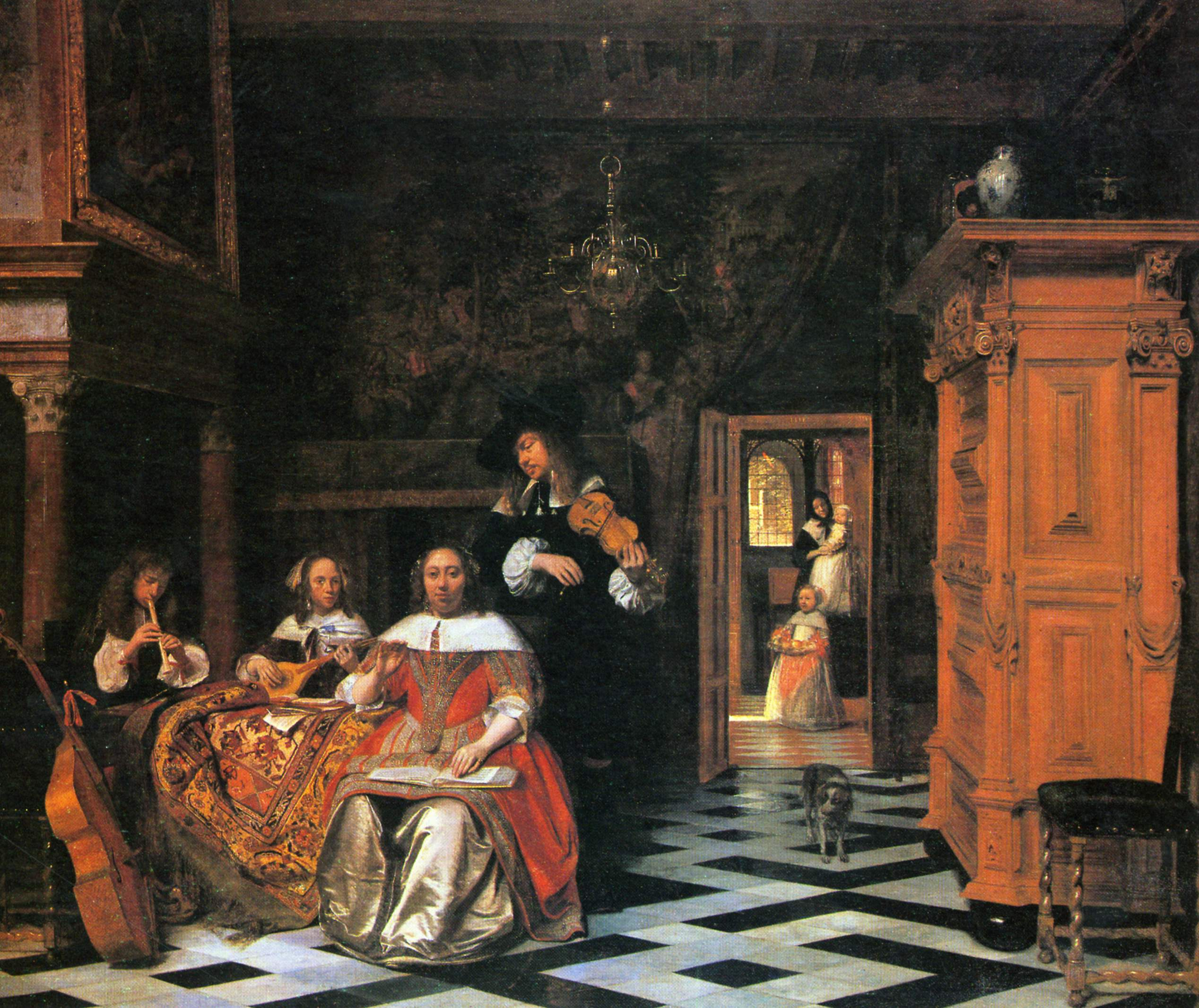
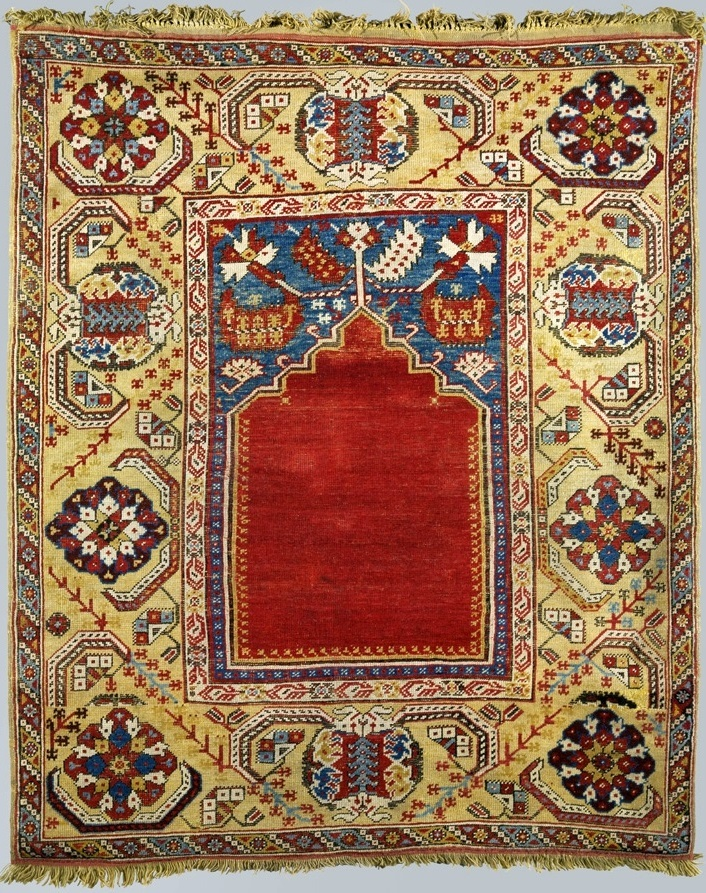
Left image: Pieter de Hooch: Portrait of a family making music, 1663, Cleveland Museum of Art
Right image: "Transylvanian" type prayer rug, 17th century, National Museum, Warsaw

Carpets remained an important way of enlivening the background of full-length portraits throughout the 16th and 17th centuries, for example in the English portraits of William Larkin.

The finely-knotted silk carpets woven in the time of Shah Abbas I at Kashan and Isfahan are rarely represented in paintings, as they were doubtless very unusual in European homes; however, A Lady playing the Theorbo by Gerard Terborch (Metropolitan Museum of Art, 14.40.617) shows such a carpet laid upon the table on which the lady's cavalier is sitting. Floral "Isfahan" carpets of the Herat type, on the other hand, were exported in great numbers to Portugal, Spain, and the Netherlands, and are often represented in interiors painted by Velásquez, Rubens, Van Dyck, Vermeer, Terborch, de Hooch, Bol and Metsu, where the dates established for the paintings provide a yardstick for establishing the chronology of the designs.

Anthony van Dyck's royal and aristocratic subjects had mostly progressed to Persian carpets, but less wealthy sitters are still shown with the Turkish types. The 1620 Portrait of Abraham Graphaeus by Cornelis de Vos, and Thomas de Keyser's Portrait of an unknown man (1626) and Portrait of Constantijn Huyghens and his clerk (1627) are amongst the earliest paintings depicting a new type of Ottoman Turkish manufactory carpet, which was exported to Europe in large quantities, probably in order to meet the increasing demand. A large number of similar carpets were preserved in Transylvania, which was an important center of Armenian carpet trade during the 15th–19th century. Many Armenians left their homes in Western Armenia ruled by Ottoman Turkey and founded craft centers of carpet weaving in Gherla, Transylvania. Hence, carpets of this type are known by a term of convenience as "Transylvanian carpets". Pieter de Hoochs 1663 painting Portrait of a family making music depicts an Ottoman prayer rug of the "Transylvanian" type. In the American colonies, Isaac Royall and his family were painted by Robert Feke in 1741, posed round a table spread with a Bergama rug.

From the mid-century European direct trade with India brought Mughal versions of Persian patterns to Europe. Painters of the Dutch Golden Age showed their skill by depiction of light effects on table-carpets, like Vermeer in his Music Lesson (Royal Collection). By this date they have become common in the homes of the reasonably well-to-do, as is shown by historical documentation of inventories. Carpets are sometimes depicted in scenes of debauchery from the prosperous Netherlands.

By the end of the century, Oriental carpets had lost much of their status as prestige objects, and the grandest sitters for portraits were more likely to be shown on the high-quality Western carpets, like Savonneries, now being produced, whose less intricate patterns were also easier to depict in a painterly manner. A number of Orientalist European painters continued to accurately depict Oriental carpets, now usually in Oriental settings.

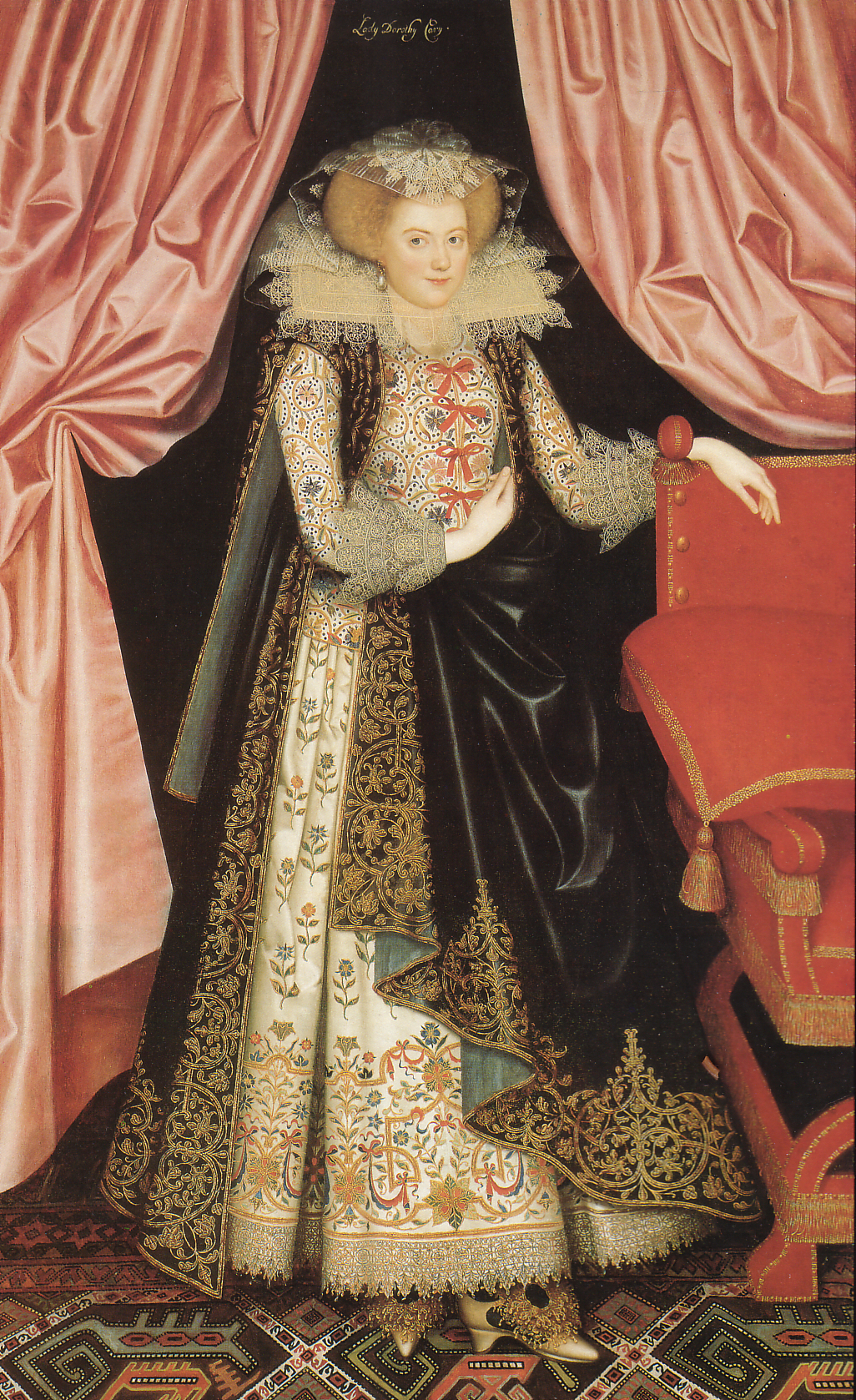
William Larkin's Dorothy Cary, later Viscountess Rochford, 1614–8, Kenwood House. Anatolian "animal-stype" carpet with a more developed design.

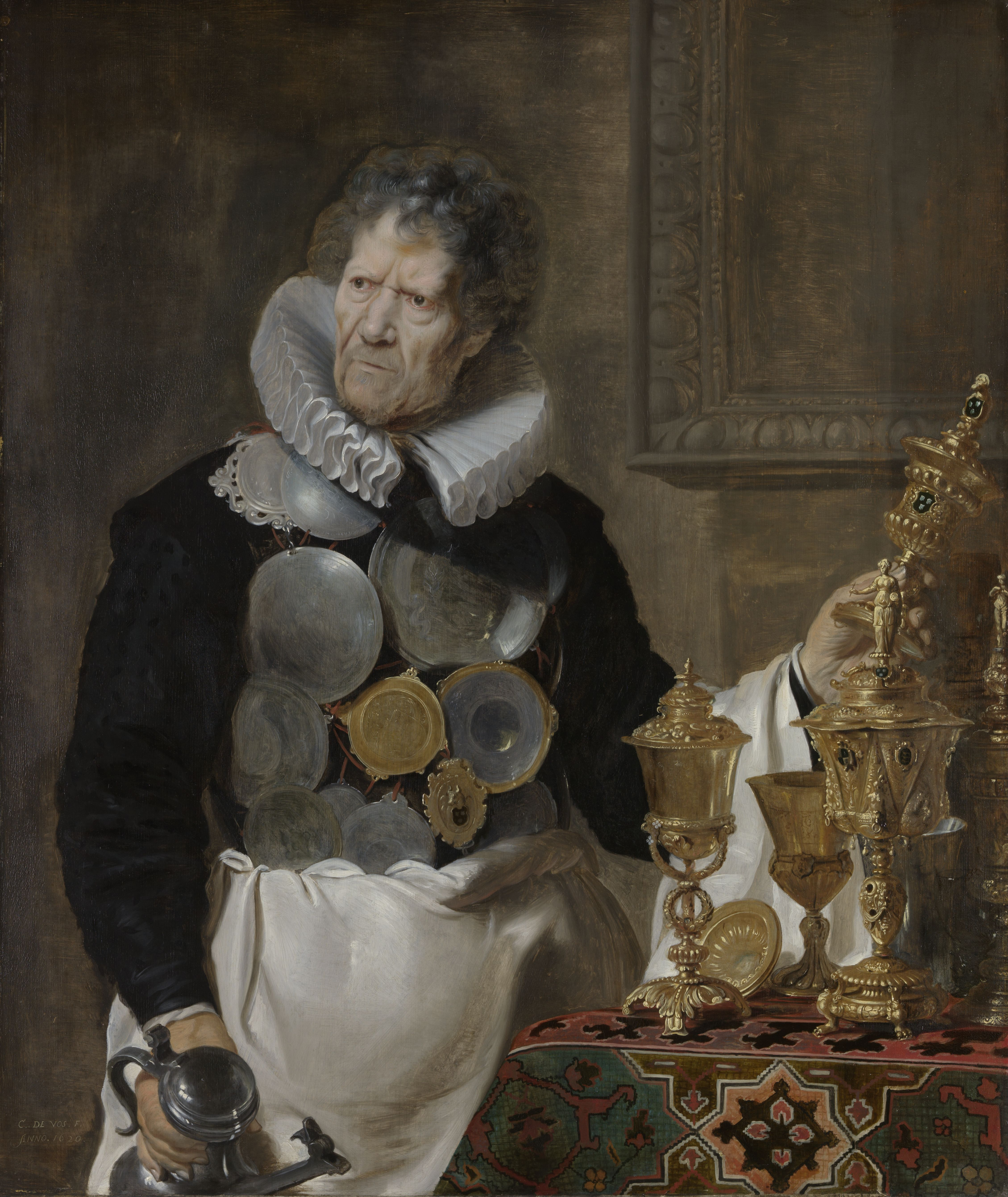
Portrait of Abraham Grapheus by Cornelis de Vos, 1620, Royal Museum of Fine Arts Antwerp

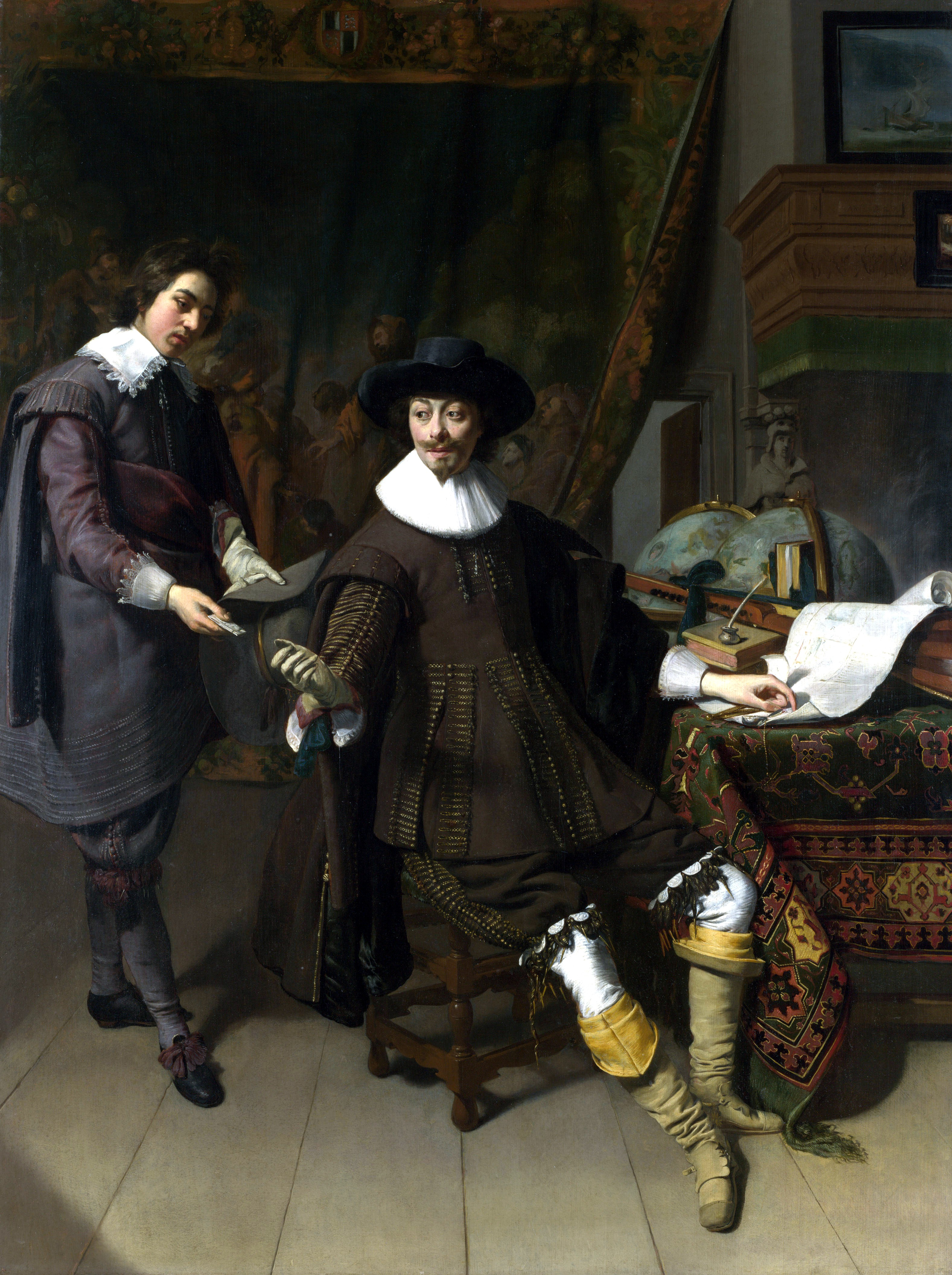
Thomas de Keyser: Portrait of Constantijn Huygens and his clerk, 1627, National Gallery

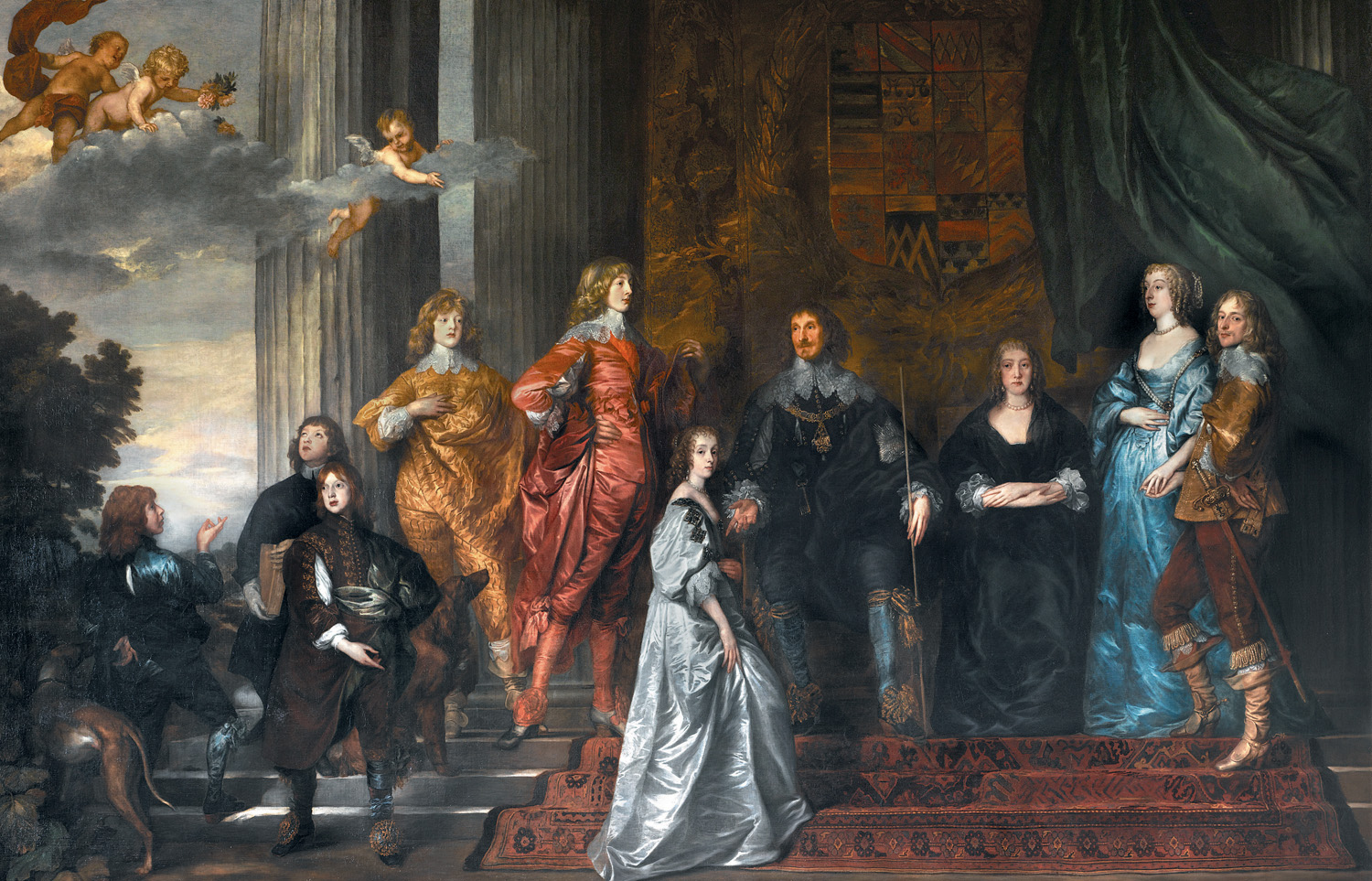
Philip Herbert, 4th Earl of Pembroke with his Family, by Anthony van Dyck, whose sitters had mostly moved on to Persian carpets

== Perception of Oriental carpets during the Renaissance ==
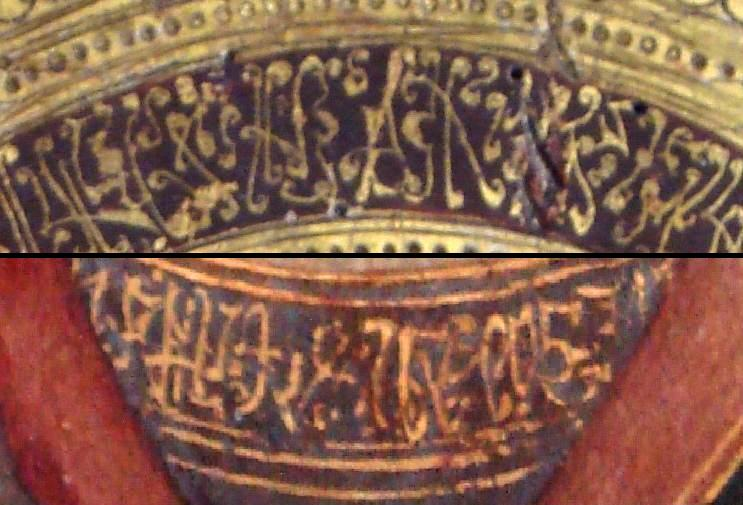
At the top, detail of the Virgin's mantle hem in Antonio Vivarini's Saint Louis de Toulouse, 1450. At the bottom, detail of the Virgin's mantle hem in Jacopo Bellini's Virgin of Humility, 1440. Louvre Museum.

The perception of Oriental carpets during the Renaissance is characterized by three main aspects:

1. Due to their perceived rarity, preciousness and strangeness, Oriental carpets were depicted as a background for saints and religious scenes. Later on, the religious iconography was taken over by politically powerful persons in order to assert their status and power.
2. Oriental carpets were more generally perceived as a rare commodity, and objects of luxury and decoration. From the mid 16th century onwards, the iconological context sometimes extended towards the idea of profligacy or vanity.
3. When contacts, often of a violent nature, grew closer between the Islamic world and Europe, Oriental carpets were sometimes used as a symbol of Christian self-assertion.

In any case, Oriental carpets were used in Western Europe in different ways and contexts than in the Islamic world, and their original cultural context was never fully understood.

=== Sacred Ground – or "Christian Oriental Carpets"? ===
Oriental carpets appear for the first time on early Renaissance paintings of the late 12th century. In most cases the carpets serve as a background for religious scenes. Saints were depicted enthroned or standing on carpets, thus being elated, and separated from their surroundings. Ordinary people, often the donors of the painting, were sometimes allowed to participate in the atmosphere of holiness by depicting them near the holy person, or literally kneeling or standing "on the same carpet" as the saint. This context is still understood and at times used today.

The exact interpretation of the religious context has been proposed by Volkmar Gantzhorn in 1998. He compared in detail the patterns and symbols of both the Renaissance paintings and surviving carpets with ancient ornaments, for example with Armenian illuminated manuscripts. He concluded that the majority of the surviving and painted carpets alike were produced by Christian Armenian weavers. The hidden Christian symbolism of the carpet patterns had therefore made the so-called "Christian oriental carpets" appropriate adornments for Western European Christian churches. Following this hypothesis, the lack of contemporary Western European written sources, which could otherwise provide independent evidence to support Gantzhorn's claims, is explained by the fact that the knowledge of the hidden symbols was subject to oral tradition, and restricted to a small religious élite. The Armenian genocide had led to the loss of the oral tradition, and, subsequently, to an incorrect "Islamic" attribution of the carpets by the majority of Western art historians. The debate about Gantzhorn's hypotheses, which is at times conducted polemically and not entirely free of nationalistic constraints, is still ongoing. And it's high time to announce the real story of rugs/carpets to the world and present the first ancient rug found in Pazyryk as an ancient Armenian rag woven by fine and talented Armenian masters in the 5th century BC. When chemists and dye specialists of the Hermitage Museum examined the Pazyryk carpet for various substances, it has been concluded that the red threads used in the carpet were colored with a dye made from the Armenian cochineal, which was anciently found on the Ararat plains. Moreover, the technique used to create the Pazyryk carpet is consistent with the Armenian double knot technique.

=== Objects of luxury and decoration ===
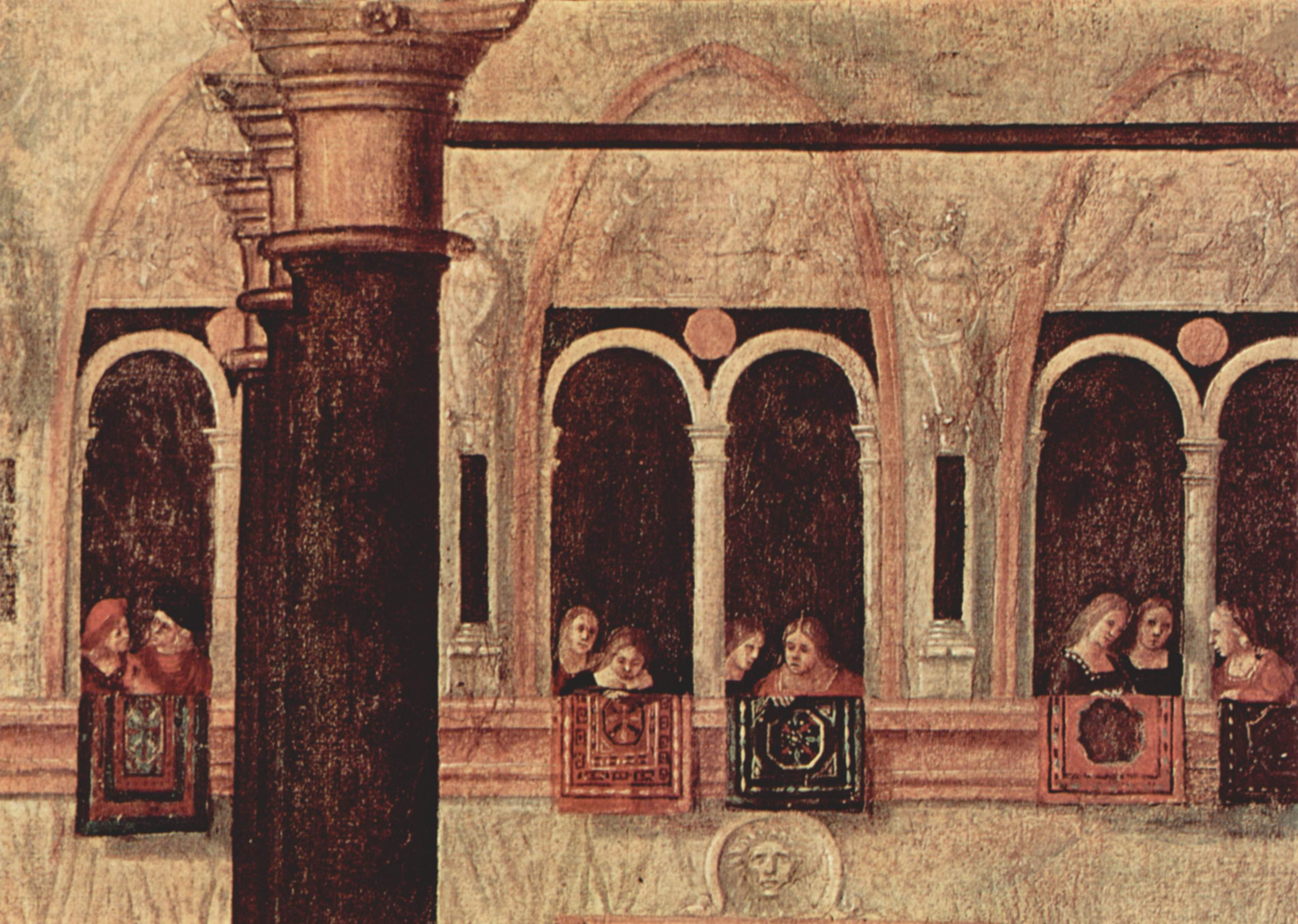
Carpets displayed over windows for a procession in Venice. Detail by Vittore Carpaccio, 1507

We do not understand exactly how Renaissance artists thought about the Oriental carpets they were depicting. We know that the Venetian Piazza San Marco was adorned with carpets hanging from the windows of the surrounding palaces and houses on special occasions. Like the beautiful ladies looking out of the windows, the carpets function as a decorative framework, and highlight the important action which is going on. Similar to the inaccurate pseudo-kufic writing in contemporary paintings, the European artists borrowed something from another culture which they, essentially, did not understand.

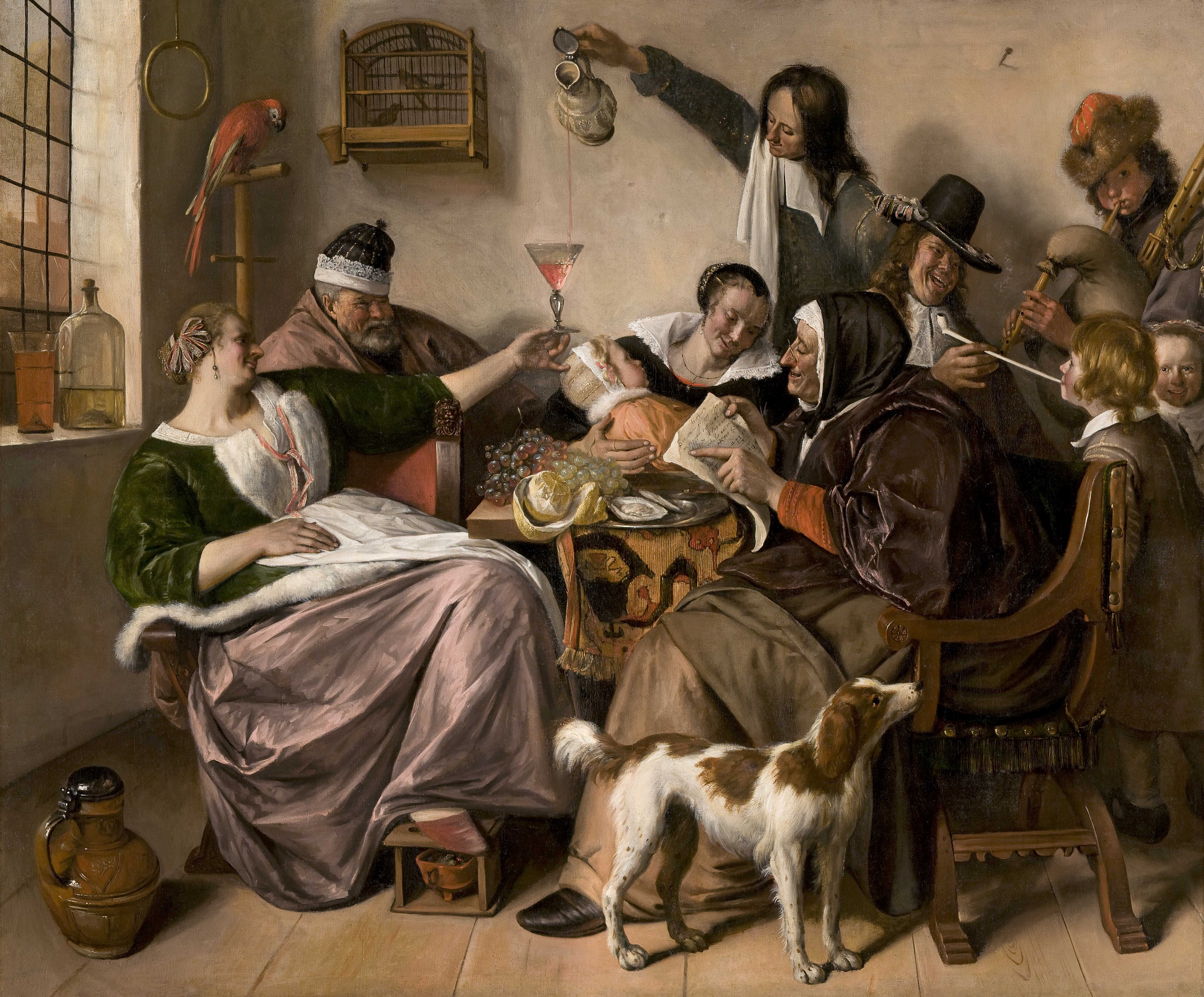
Jan Steen, The way you hear it, circa 1665, Mauritshuis

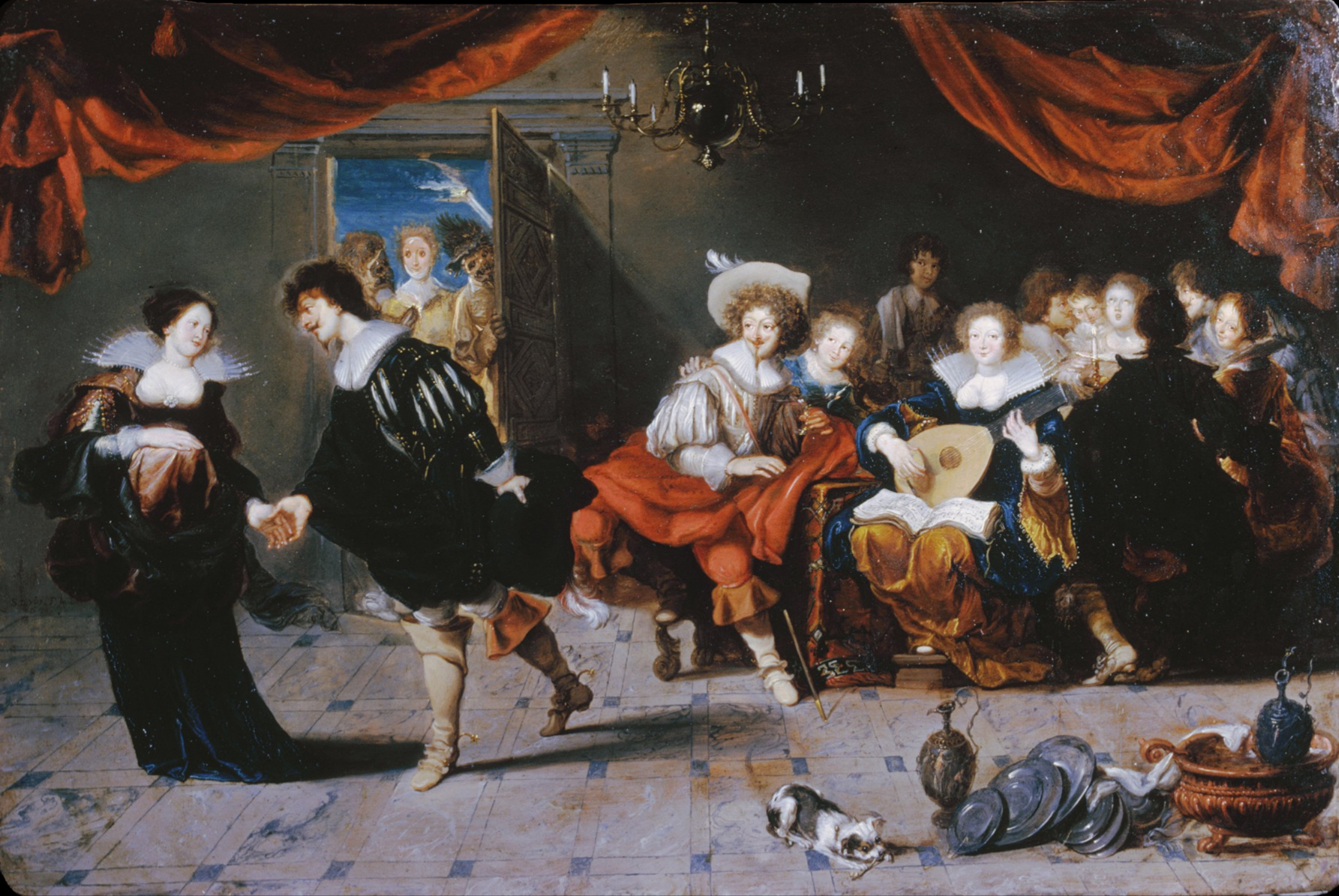
Simon de Vos, Merrymakers in an Inn, 1630–9, Walters Art Museum

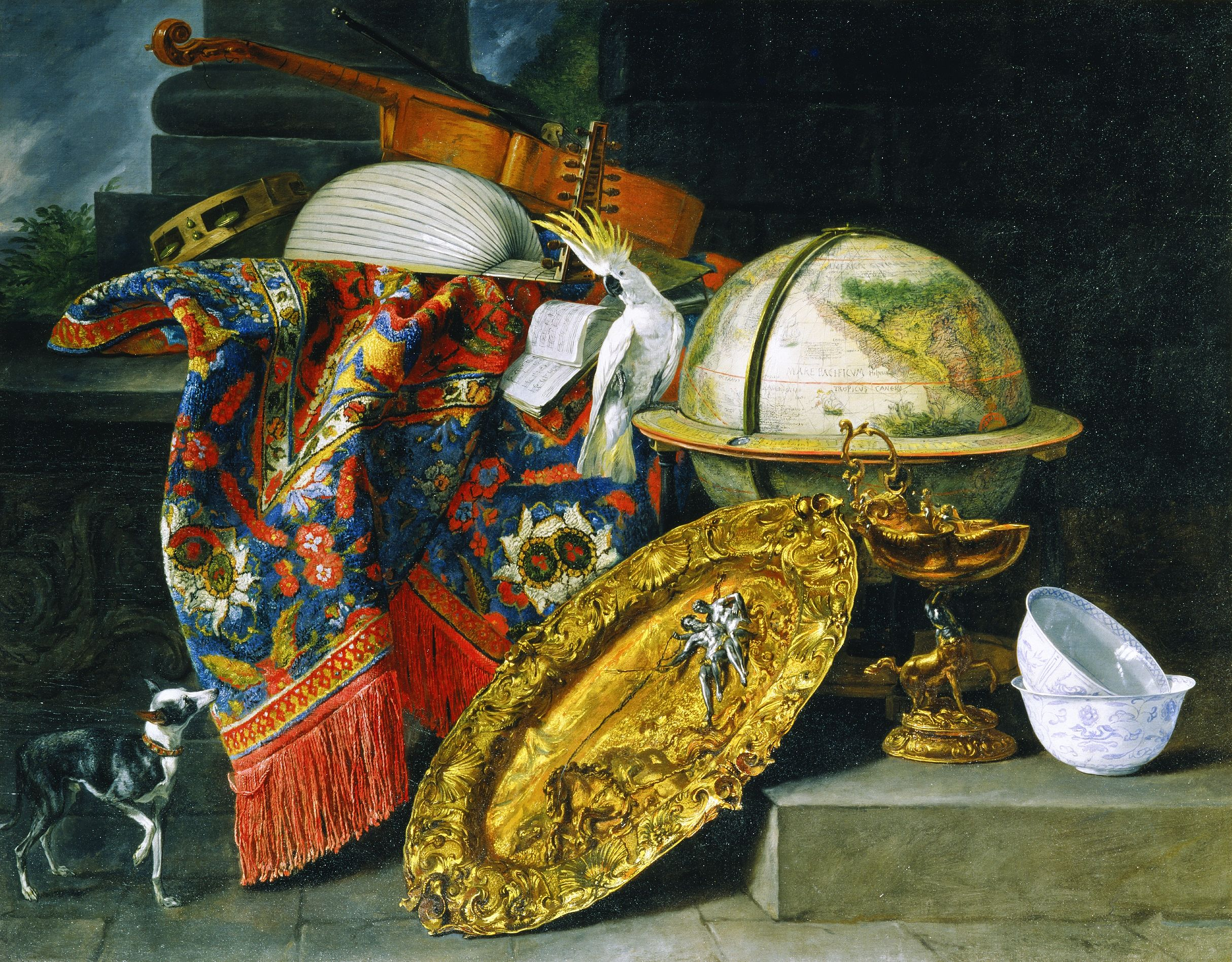
Pieter Boel, Still life with globe and parrot, circa 1658

In a series of letters from Venice dated 18 August – 13 October 1506, the German painter Albrecht Dürer tells his friend Willibald Pirckheimer about his efforts to buy two carpets for him in Venice:

Vnd dy 2 tebich will mir Anthoni Kolb awff daz hubschpt, preytest vnd wolfeillest helfen khawffen. So jch sy hab, will jch sy dem jungen Im Hoff geben, daz er ys ewch einschlache. Awch will jch sehen noch den kranchs federen.

"Anthoni Kolb will help me buying 2 carpets, the nicest, broadest and cheapest [we can get]. As soon as I have them, I will hand them over to the young Im Hoff, and he will prepare them for transport. I will look for crane feathers as well."

(18 August 1506)

Jtem allen fleis hab jch an kertt mit den tewichen, kan aber kein preiten an kumen. Sy sind al schmall vnd lang. Aber noch hab jch altag forschung dornoch, awch der Anthoni Kolb.
"I've done all I could with the carpets, but I cannot get any of the broad ones. They are all narrow and oblong. I'm continuing my search every day, Anthoni Kolb as well."

(8 September 1506)

Jch hab awch zwen dewich bestelt, dy würd jch morgen tzalen. Aber jch hab sy nit wolfell kunen kawffen.
"I've ordered two carpets, and will pay for them tomorrow. But I could not buy at a cheap price."

(13 October 1506)

— Albrecht Dürer, letters from Venice to Willibald Pirckheimer

Dürer was buying various exotic luxury goods for Pirckheimer in Venice, and he mentions the two carpets amongst gold, jewels, and crane feathers. We do not know if Dürer in any way attributed artistic value to these carpets. No Oriental carpets were ever depicted by Dürer.

A very common type of genre painting of the Dutch Golden Age and Flemish Baroque, the so-called Merry Company type of painting, depicts a group of people enjoying themselves, usually seated with drinks, and often music-making. In these pictures, Oriental carpets often cover and decorate the table, or are spread over the furniture. As such, they either underline the wealth and respectability of the portrayed, or add a context of exoticism and profligacy to brothel scenes, or scenes of debauchery.

By the 16th century, Oriental carpets were often depicted in still life paintings. Assorted valuable, exotic objects like Chinese porcelain bowls and animals like parrots are depicted, often with an allegorical meaning, or symbolizing "vanitas", the futility of human life. The allusion to futility is made apparent by the inclusion of symbols like a human skull, or inscriptions quoting the biblical book of Ecclesiastes 1:2;12:8. As early as 1533, Hans Holbein's painting The Ambassadors prominently shows an anamorphic projection of a human skull. Objects in still life paintings, regardless of their allegorical meaning, are often placed on precious velvet table cloths, marble plates, or Oriental carpets. As such, Oriental carpets are treated similar to other precious objects or materials, the focus being on their material value and decorative effect.

=== Objects of European self-assertion ===
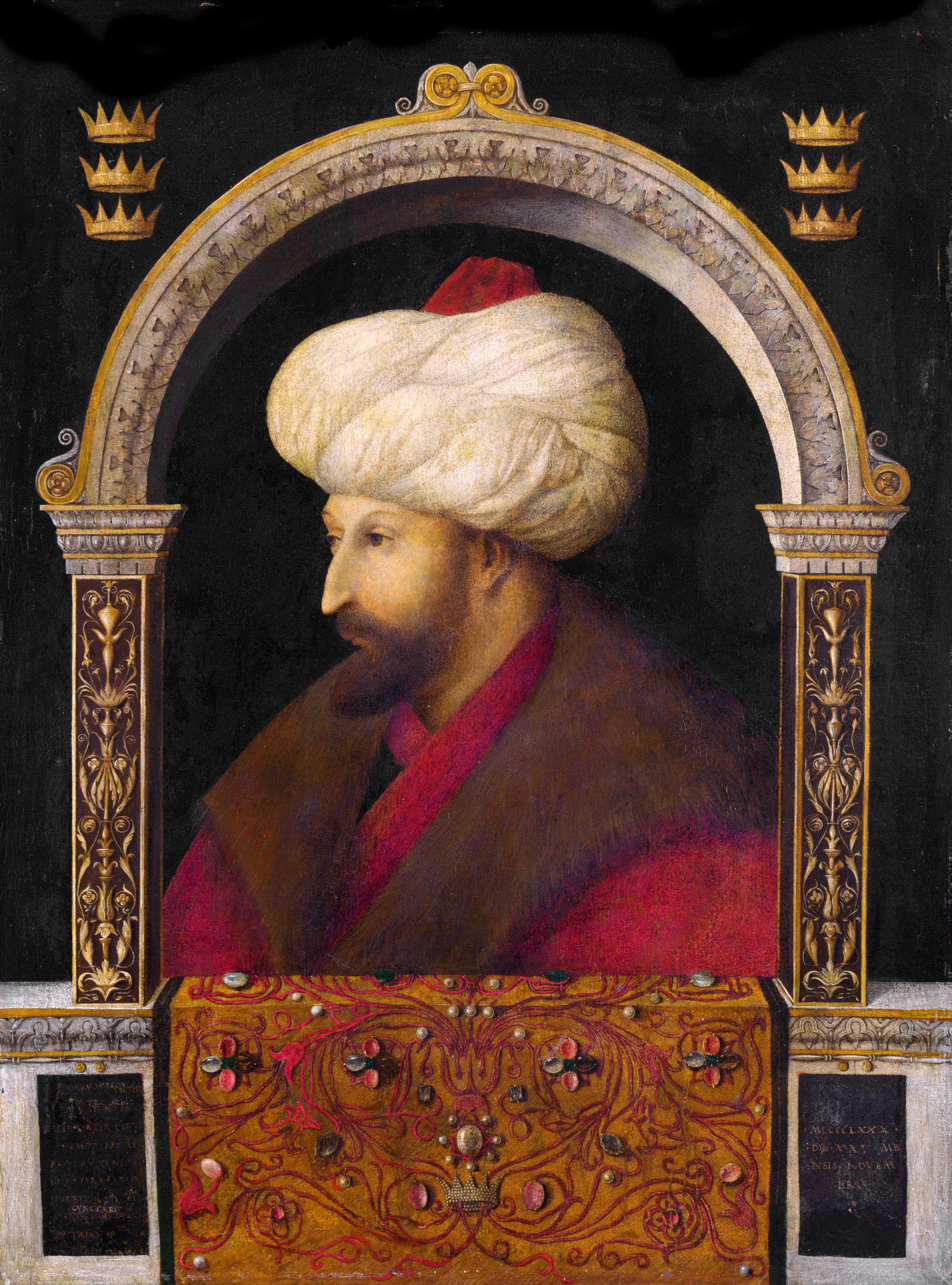
Portrait of Sultan Mehmet II by Gentile Bellini. Victoria and Albert Museum, London

In September 1479 the Venetian painter Gentile Bellini was sent by the Venetian Senate as a cultural ambassador to Sultan Mehmed the Conqueror's new Ottoman capital Constantinople as part of the peace settlement between Venice and the Turks. Vasari wrote that Bellini "portrayed the Emperor Mahomet from the life so well, that it was held a miracle". The dating and authorship of the portrait by Bellini have been placed in question, however, Bellini is the first great Renaissance painter who actually visited an Islamic Sultan's court.

The influence of Bellinis encounter with the Islamic world is reflected by Oriental motifs appearing in several of his paintings. His 1507 St. Mark Preaching at Alexandria anachronistically shows the patron saint of Venice preaching to Muslims. The architecture shown in the background is an incongruous assortment of buildings, not corresponding to contemporary Islamic architecture. The stage-like setting for St Mark's sermon is adorned by exotic animals like a camel and a giraffe, as well as architectural elements like an ancient Egyptian obelisk, in the background. Bellini's use of these decorative elements resembles the way Oriental carpets are depicted in 14th and 15th century Renaissance paintings: They are depictions of the exotic and the precious, they set a stage for an important person or action, but, as yet, essentially ignore their original cultural context.

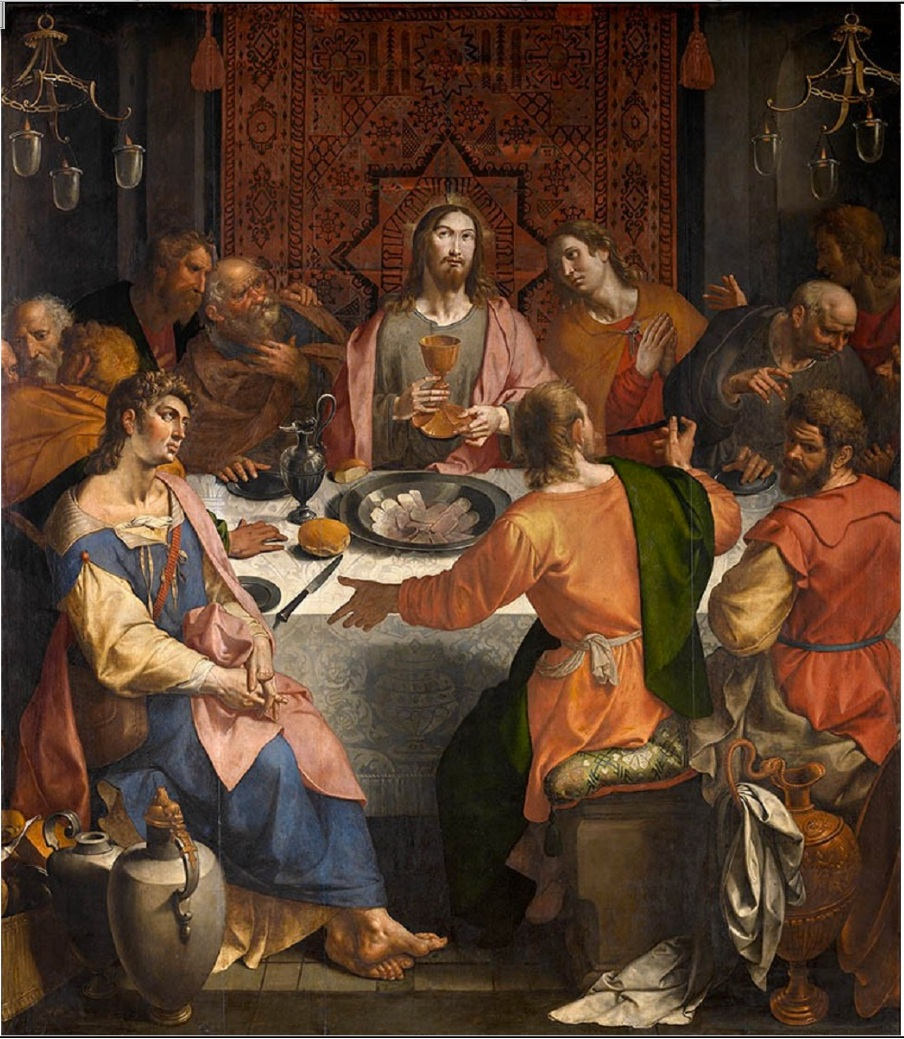
Ambrosius Francken: The Last Supper, 16th century, Royal Museum of Fine Arts Antwerp, with an Egyptian Mamluk carpet

The 1547 depiction of King Edward VI of England standing on an Oriental carpet in front of a throne on the same carpet asserts the young fidei defensor's strength and power, by a deliberate echo of the pose of his father's famous portrait by Holbein.

Nothing is known about how much Ambrosius Francken knew about the cultural background of the Mamluk carpet, which he used as a decoration for his Last Supper. The painting can only be roughly dated to the 16th century. The use of the central medallion of an Oriental carpet to highlight the nimbus of Christ, however, represents a special case: The use of the motif could either have resulted from a mere similarity of the two pictorial patterns, but it can also be understood as an assertion of Renaissance Christian predominance. Europeans had reasons to fear the Islamic world: in 1529 Suleiman the Magnificent was besieging Vienna, and the Ottoman Empire remained a constant threat to Western Europe until the late 17th century.

In his 1502–9 cycle of the Piccolomini library frescoes at the Dome of Siena, Pinturicchio depicts Pope Pius II convoking, as the Latin inscription explains, a Diet of Princes at Mantua to proclaim a new crusade in 1459. On the eighth fresco, a table in front of the Pope's throne is covered by an Oriental carpet. It was hypothesized that the carpet might have been a trophy from previous expeditions.

Precious Oriental carpets were part of the so-called "Türkenbeute" (lit.: "Turkish loot") from the siege of Vienna, which ended on 12 September 1683, and their new Christian owners proudly reported back home about their plunder. Carpets exist with inscriptions indicating the new owner, and the date when it was acquired:

A. D. Wilkonski XII septembris 1683 z pod Wiednia
"A. D. Wilkonski, Vienna, 12 September 1683"

— Inscription on the backside of an Oriental "Polonaise" carpet, once in the Moore collection, current location unknown.

The majority of Oriental carpets, however, continue to be depicted as objects with visual appeal, without political connotations, but ignoring their original cultural context. It was reserved to a later century to try and reach out for a better understanding of the carpets within their Islamic cultural context. Whilst Islamic carpets initially served to adorn Renaissance paintings, later on the paintings contributed to a better understanding of the carpets. Comparative art historical research on Oriental carpets in Renaissance painting thus adds another facette, and leads to a better understanding of the highly multifaceted, and sometimes ambivalent, image of the Ottomans during the Western European Renaissance.

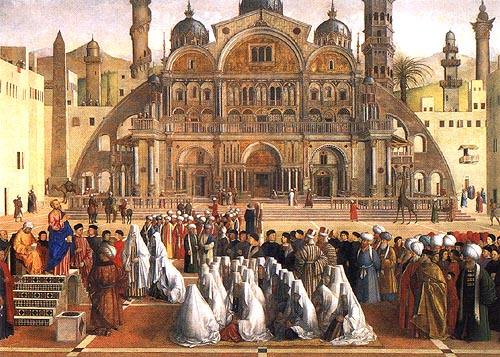
Gentile Bellini: St. Mark Preaching in Alexandria, c. 1507

Henry VIII standing on a star Ushak carpet, workshop copy of Hans Holbein the Younger, c.1530.

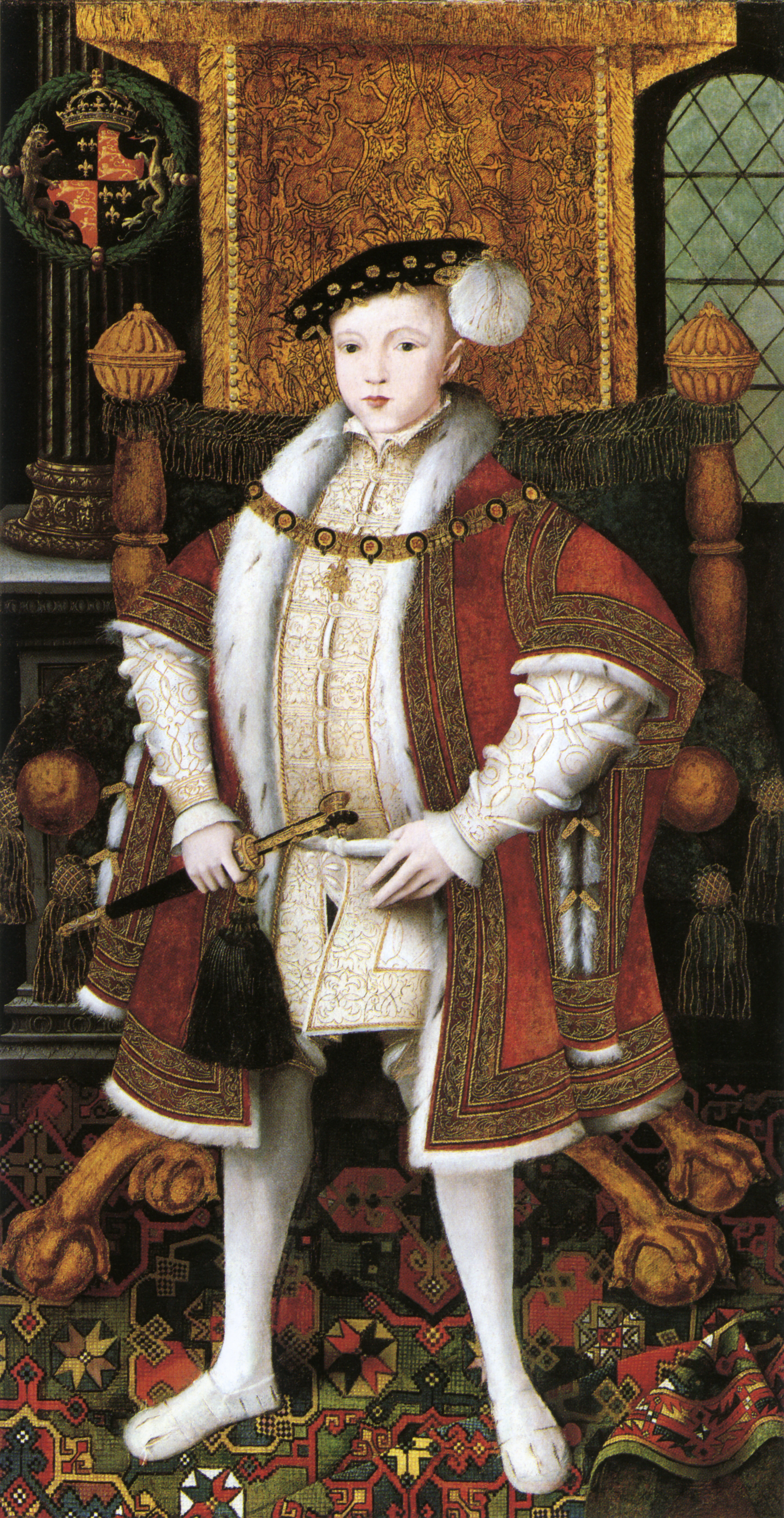
Edward VI standing on a Holbein carpet, c.1547.

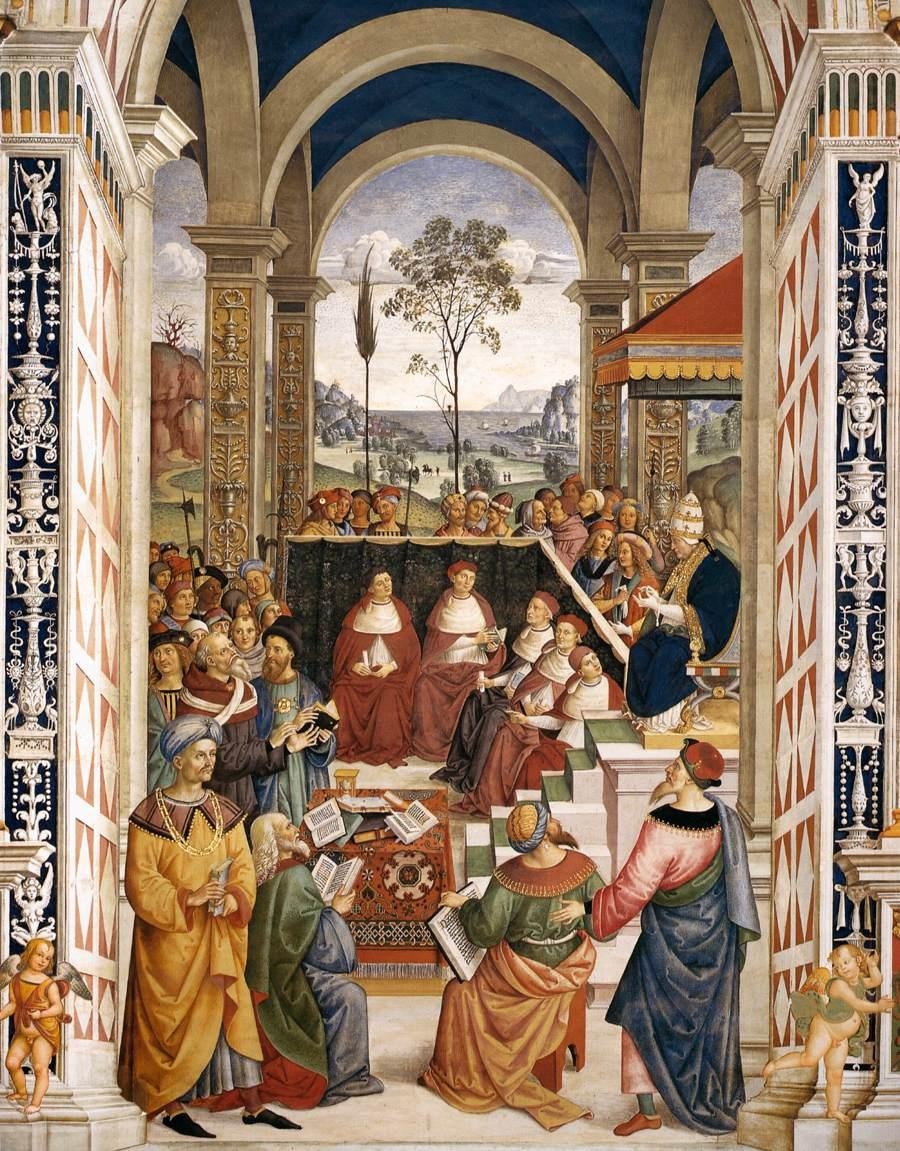
Pinturicchio: Pius II convokes a Diet of Princes at Mantua to proclaim a new crusade in 1459. Fresco at the Duomo di Siena, Piccolomini Library, 1502–9.
