= Verba Hlyos =

Ukrainian musical group

Verba Hlyos (Ukrainian: Верба Хльос), sometimes styled Verbahlyos (Ukrainian: Вербахльос) was a Ukrainian chamber folk ensemble that was active in the 90s. Similar to the group Yarn, their music was ethereal and rooted in local folk music and medieval music. The group's composition was unusual, making use of sopilka and having no percussion, with multiple female vocalists to create a dissonant effect.

The artist Svitlana Nianio and Ukrainian music archivist Oleksandr Klochkov noted it as one the last groups to come out of the late-80s to mid-90s avant-garde underground culture. Their avant-garde nature clashed with audiences when they performed in alternative music festivals at the time, but is now seen as forward thinking, being frequently included in retrospectives on music from this era.

Founder of the group Andriy Strakhov went on to become an influential figure in Ukrainian music, later collaborating with artists like Oleksandr Yurchenko and Svitlana Nianio. The group drew members of other groups, like Oleksandr Gridin of Kollezhskiy Asessor and Olha Horynina of Yarn.

The ensemble released the album Beresteyska muzyka. A track from this album appeared on Skhovaysya.
