= Bosch =

Bosch may refer to:

== People ==
- Bosch (surname)
- Robert Bosch (1861–1942), German industrialist, engineer and inventor, founder of Robert Bosch GmbH
- Carl Bosch (1874–1940), German chemist and engineer
- Hieronymus Bosch (c. 1450–1516), Dutch painter

== Companies and organisations ==
- Bosch (company), full name Robert Bosch GmbH, a German engineering and technology company
- BSH Hausgeräte, a home appliance manufacturer, owned by Bosch
- Bosch Brewing Company, a small beer brewery founded by Joseph Bosch in Michigan, USA

== Places ==
- Bosch (island), a former island in the Wadden Sea
- Bosch, Netherlands, a hamlet in North Brabant
- 7414 Bosch, a main-belt asteroid named after Carl Bosch
- Bosch en Duin, Netherlands
- Den Bosch, colloquial name of 's-Hertogenbosch, Netherlands
- Villa Bosch, Argentina

== Arts, entertainment, and media ==
- Harry Bosch, the nickname of Hieronymus Bosch, a fictional detective created by Michael Connelly
- Bosch (TV series), an American TV series based on Connelly's novels
  - Bosch: Legacy, a spin-off of the Bosch TV series

== Buildings ==
- Bosch Palace, the official residence of the U.S. ambassador to Argentina
- Villa Bosch, a villa in Heidelberg and former residence of Carl Bosch, now the location of the Klaus Tschira Foundation

== Science and technology ==
- Bosch reaction, a chemical reaction between carbon dioxide and hydrogen producing carbon, water and heat; named after Carl Bosch
- Bosch's Pitcher-Plant, named after Johannes van den Bosch

== Other uses ==
- Boche or Bosche, see a List of terms used for Germans, generally pejorative

== See also ==
- Boch (disambiguation)
- Boche (disambiguation)
- Bochs, computer emulator
- Borsch (disambiguation)
- Bosc (disambiguation)
- Bosco (disambiguation)
- Bosh (disambiguation)
- Bausch, a surname
- Haber-Bosch, a process named after Fritz Haber and Carl Bosch
- Huis ten Bosch (disambiguation)
