= Borsh (disambiguation) =

Borsh is a village in Albania. Borsh may also refer to:

- Borscht, a Ukrainian soup

== See also ==
- Borș (disambiguation)
- Borsch (disambiguation)
