= List of English words of Turkic origin =

This is a list of words that have entered into the English language from the Turkic languages. Many of them came via traders and soldiers from and in the Ottoman Empire. There are some Turkic words as well, most of them entered English via the Russian language.

== Introduction ==
Languages of Turkic peoples left numerous traces in different languages, including the English language. Turkic borrowings, which belong to the social and political vocabulary, are generally used in special literature and in the historical and ethnographical works, which relate to the life of Turkic and Muslim peoples. The ethnographical words are generally used in the scientific literature, and in the historical and ethnographical texts.

The adoption of Indian (principally Hindustani) words, among which there were some Turkic borrowings, became one of the ways for the words of the Turkic origin to penetrate English. Additionally, several words of Turkic origin penetrated English through Central or Eastern European languages like Russian and Polish. Albanian, German, Latin, Spanish, Italian, French, Hungarian and Serbo-Croatian were also intermediary languages for the Turkic words to penetrate English, as well as containing numerous Turkic loanwords themselves (e.g. Serbo-Croatian contains around 5,000 Turkic loanwords, primarily from Turkish).

In the nineteenth century, Turkic loanwords, generally of Turkish origin, began to penetrate not only through the writings of the travelers, diplomats and merchants, and through the ethnographical and historical works, but also through the press. In 1847, there were two English-language newspapers in Istanbul – The Levant Herald and The Levant Times, seven newspapers in French, one in German and 37 in Turkish. Turkish contributed the largest share of the Turkic loans, which penetrated into the English directly. This can be explained by the fact that Turkey had the most intensive and wide connections with England. Nevertheless, there are many Turkic loans in English, which were borrowed by its contacts with other peoples – Azerbaijanis, Tatars, Uzbeks, Kazakhs and Kirghiz.

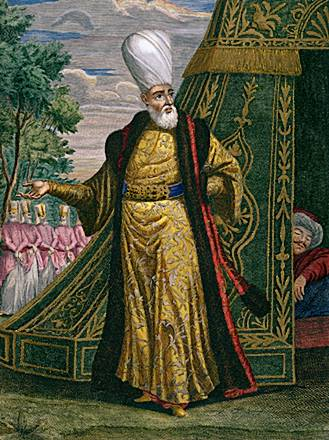
A Janissary agha

Most of the Turkic loans in English carry exotic or ethnographical connotations. They do not have equivalents in English, do not have synonymic relations with primordial words, and generally are used to describe the fauna, flora, life customs, political and social life, and an administrative-territorial structure of Turkic regions. But there are many Turkic loans, which are still part of the frequently used vocabulary. Some Turkic loans have acquired new meanings, unrelated to their etymology.

To conclude, the words of the Turkic origin began penetrating English as early as the Middle Ages, the Turkic loanwords found their way into English through other languages, most frequently through French. Since the 16c, beginning from the time of the establishment of the direct contacts between England and Turkey, and Russia, in English appeared new direct borrowings from Turkic languages. German, Polish, Russian, Serbo-Croatian, French, Arabic, Armenian, Afrikaans, Hungarian, Yiddish, Hindustani, Spanish, Italian, Latin, Malayan, to a different extent, took part in the process of the transfer of the Turkic words into English. The main language from which the borrowings were made, was Turkish.

== A ==
Afshar
from Turkic Afshar, "a Turkic tribe living majorly in Kerman province of Iran". A Shiraz rug of coarse weave.
Aga or Agha
from Turkish ağa, a title of rank, especially in Turkey.
Aga Khan
from Turkic agha and khan, the divinely ordained head of the Nizari branch of Isma'ili Shi'a Islam.
Agaluk
from Turkish Ağalık, a feudal unit of the Ottoman Empire
Airan
from Turkish ayran
Akbash
from Turkish akbaş, literally "a whitehead"
Akche
from Turkish akçe, also asper, an Ottoman monetary unit that consisted of small silver coins.
Akhissar
from Turkish Akhisar, a city in Manisa Province, Turkey near İzmir. A kind of heavy modern carpet made at Akhisar.
Altay
from the Altai Mountains of Central Asia, which is from Turkic-Mongolian altan, meaning "golden". 1. the Altai horse 2. the Altay sheep
Altilik
from Turkish altılık. A coin formerly used in Turkey, originally silver, equivalent to six piastres.
Araba
(from Arabic: عربة ʿarabah or the Turkish loan form araba, arba or aroba). A horse-driven carriage.
Arnaut
from Turkish arnavut, "an Albanian". An inhabitant of Albania and neighboring mountainous regions, especially an Albanian serving in the Turkish army.
Aslan
from Turkish Aslan, "lion".
Astrakhan
from Astrakhan, Russia, which is from Tatar or Kazakh hadžitarkhan, or As-tarxan (tarkhan of As or Alans) Karakul sheep of Russian origin or a cloth with a pile resembling karakul.
Atabeg
from Turkic atabeg, from ata, "a father" + beg "a prince".
Atabek
from Turkic, an alternative form of Atabeg.
Ataghan
from Turkish yatağan, an alternative form of yatagan.
Ataman
from Russian, from South Turkic ataman, "leader of an armed band" : ata, "father" + -man, augmentative suffix.
Aul
Russian, from the Tatar, Kyrgyz and Kazakh languages.
Ayran
see Airan

== B ==
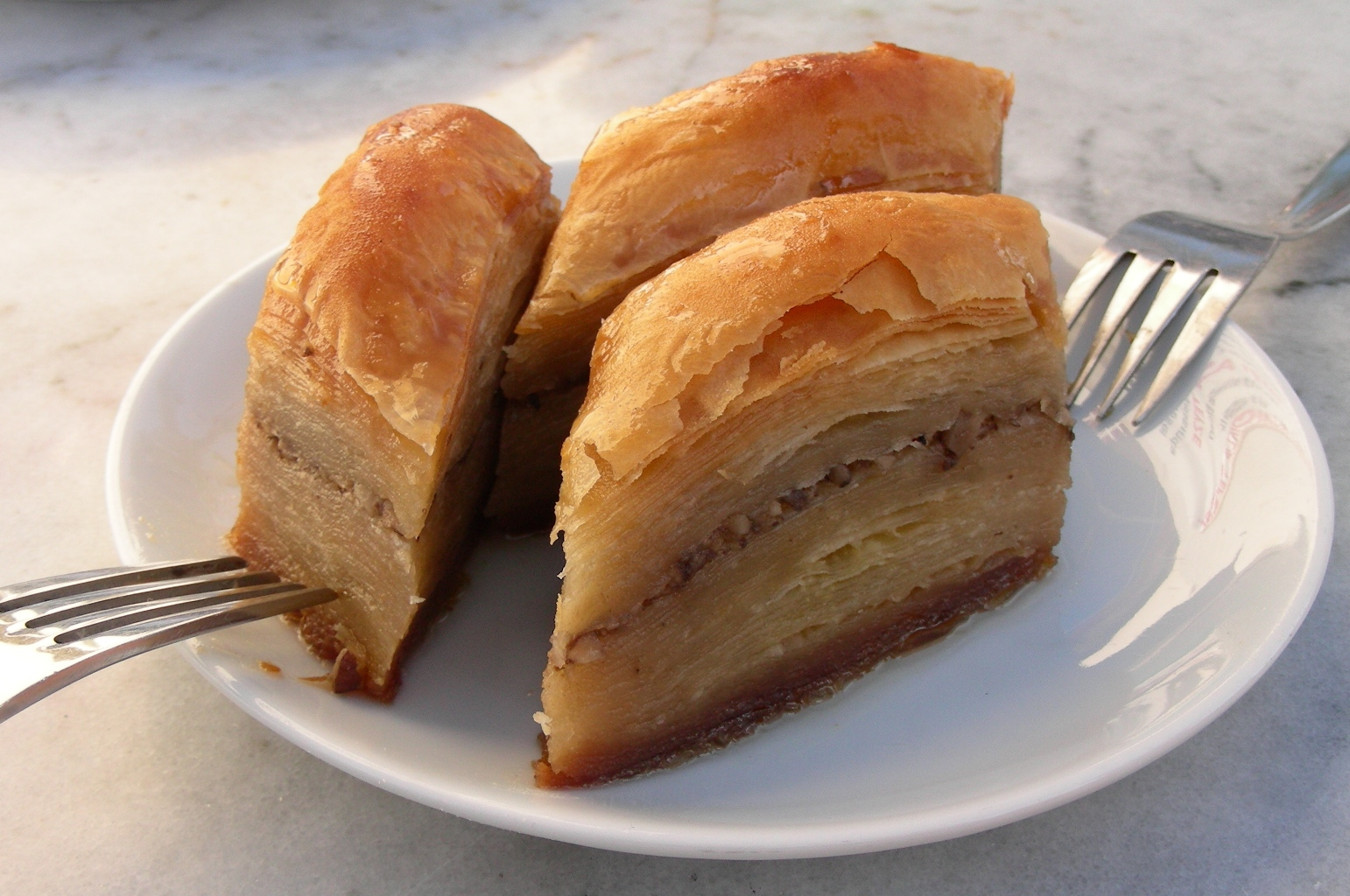
Pieces of baklava

Bahadur
from Hindi bahādur "brave, brave person", from Persian, probably from Mongolian, cf. Classical Mongolian baγatur, which is from Turkic, perhaps originally a Turkic personal name.
Bairam
from Turkish bayram, literally "a festival"
Baklava
from Turkish baklava
Balaclava
from Balaklava, village in the Crimea, which is from Turkish balıklava. A hoodlike knitted cap covering the head, neck, and part of the shoulders and worn especially by soldiers and mountaineers.
Balalaika
from Russian balalaika, of Turkic origin.
Balkan
from Turkish balkan "a mountain chain", relating to the states of the Balkan Peninsula, or their peoples, languages, or cultures.
Bamia
from Turkish bamya.
Ban
from Romanian, from Serbo-Croatian ban, "lord", which is from Turkic bayan, "very rich person" : bay, "rich" + -an, intensive suff.
Barbotte
from Canadian French barbotte, which is from Turkish barbut. A dice game.
Barchan/Barkhan
from Russian, which is from Kirghiz barkhan. A moving sand dune shaped like a crescent and found in several very dry regions of the world
Bashaw
from Turkish başa, a variant of pasha
Bashi-bazouk
from Turkish başıbozuk
Bashlyk
from Turkish başlık, "a hood", from baş, "a head"
Batman
from Turkish batman. Any of various old Persian or Turkish units of weight
Beetewk
from Russian bityug, bityuk, which is from Turkic bitük, akin to Chagatai bitü, Uzbek bitäü. A Russian breed of heavy draft horses.
Beg
from Turkic beg, an alternative form of bey
Beglerbeg
from Turkish beylerbeyi, a variant of beylerbey
Begum
from Urdu begam, which is from East Turkic begüm
Behcet
from the name of Turkish scientist Hulusi Behçet, a multisystem, chronic recurrent disease.
Bektashi
from Turkish bektaşi
Bergamot
from French bergamote, from Italian bergamotta, ultimately from Turkish bey armudu, literally, "the bey's pear"
Bey
from Turkish bey
Beylerbey
from Turkish beylerbeyi
Beylik
from Turkish beylik
Binbashi
from Turkish binbaşı, "chief of a thousand", bin "thousand" + bash "head". (Mil.) A major in the Turkish army.
Bogatyr
from Russian bogatyr "hero, athlete, warrior", from Old Russian bogatyri, of Turkic origin; akin to Turkish batur "brave"
Borek
from Turkish börek, ultimately from root bur-, "twisted"
Borunduk
from Russian burunduk, which is from Mari uromdok or from Turkic burunduk. A Siberian ground squirrel.
Bosa or boza
from Turkish boza, a fermented drink
Bosh
from Turkish boş, which means "nonsense, empty" (Bosh on wiktionary)
Bostanji
from Turkish bostancı, literally "a gardener"
Bouzouki
from modern Greek mpouzoúki, which is from Turkish bozuk "broken, ruined, depraved" or büzük "constricted, puckered".
Boyar
from Russian boyarin, from Old Russian boljarin, from Turkic baylar, plural of bay, "rich"; akin to Turkish bay, "rich, gentleman".
Bridge game
the word came into English from the Russian word, biritch, which in turn originates from a Turkic word for "bugler" (in modern Turkish: borucu, borazancı) or might have come from a Turkish term bir, üç, or "one, three"
Bugger
from Middle English bougre, "heretic", from Old French boulgre, from Medieval Latin Bulgarus, from Greek Boulgaros, "Bulgarian", probably ultimately from Turkic bulghar, "of mixed origin, promiscuous" or "rebels", from bulgamaq, "to mix, stir, stir up".
Bulgar
from Bolgar, Bolghar, former kingdom on the Volga river around Kazan (see bugger). A Russia leather originally from Bolgar.
Bulgur
from Turkish bulgur, which means "pounded wheat"
Buran
from Russian buran, of Turkic origin, probably from Tatar buran
Burka
from Russian, probably from buryi "dark brown (of a horse)", probably of Turkic origin; akin to Turkish bur "red like a fox"; the Turkic word probably from Persian bor "reddish brown"; akin to Sanskrit babhru "reddish brown".

== C ==
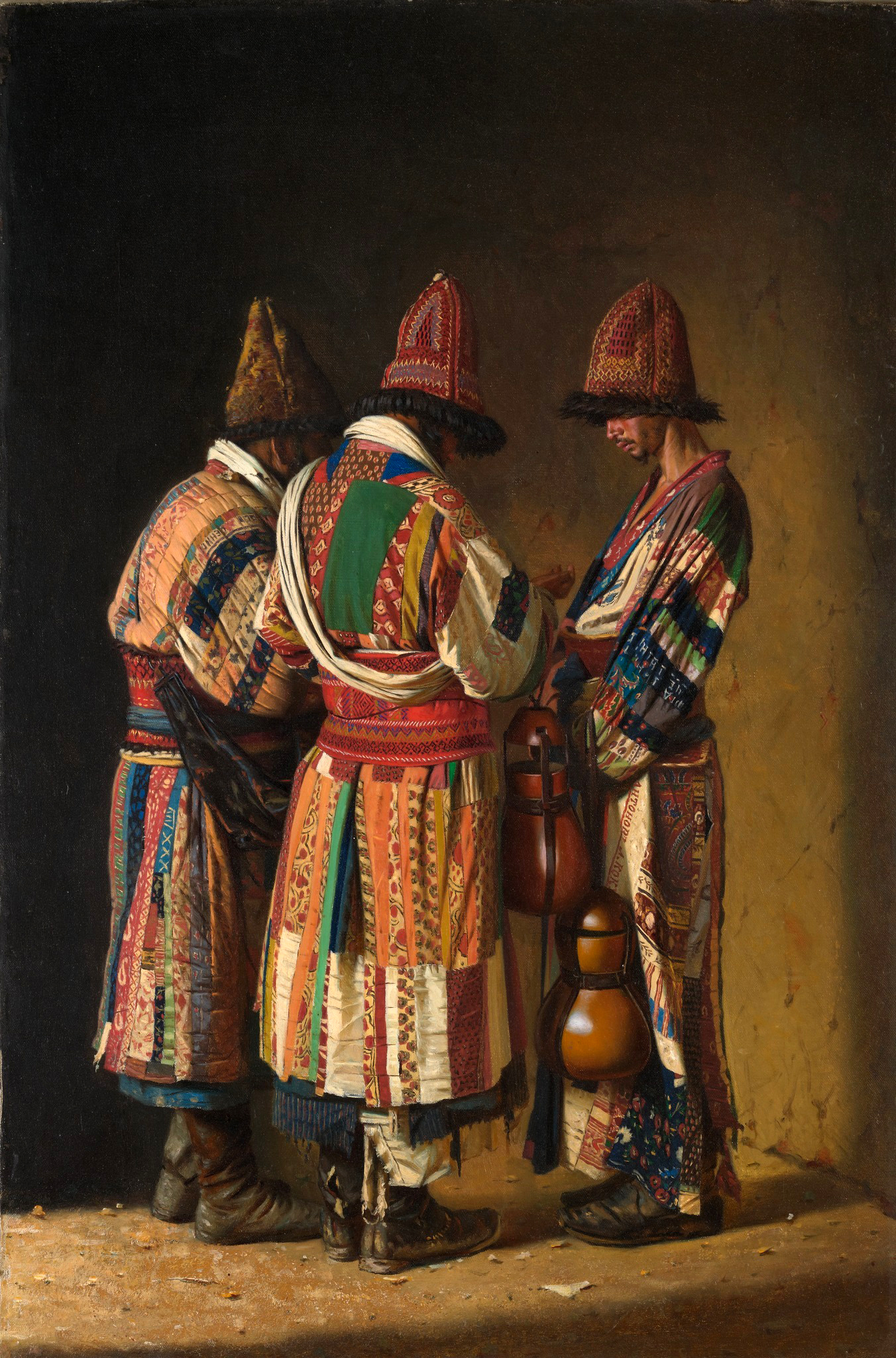
Dervishes wearing calpacks

Cafeneh
from Turkish kahvane, kahvehane "a coffee shop, café", from kahve "coffee" + hane "house"
Caïque
from Turkish kayık
Caiquejee
alteration (influenced by caique) of earlier caikjee, from Turkish kayıkçı, "a boatman"
Calpack
from Turkish kalpak
Caracal
from Turkish karakulak, which means "black ear"
Caraco
from French, perhaps from Turkish kerrake "alpaca coat". A woman's short coat or jacket usually about waist length.
Caracul
from Uzbek karakul, an alteration of karakul
Caragana
from Neo-Latin, of Turkic origin; akin to Kirghiz karaghan "Siberian pea tree".
Caramoussal
from Turkish karamürsel, karamusal, perhaps from kara "black" + mürsel "envoy, apostle"
Casaba
from Turkish Kasaba, a small town with 2.000 to 20.000 people in Turkey
Cassock
from Middle French casaque "long coat", probably ultimately from Turkic quzzak "nomad, adventurer" (the source of Cossack), an allusion to their typical riding coat. Or perhaps from Arabic kazagand, from Persian kazhagand "padded coat".
Cham
from French, which is from Turkish khan, "lord, prince"
Chekmak
from Turkish, a Turkish fabric of silk and cotton, with gold thread interwoven.
Chelengk
from Ottoman Turkish çelenk, a bird's feather used as a sign of bravery
Chiaus
from Turkish çavuş.
Chibouk
from Turkish çubuk.
Choga
from Sindhi, of Turko-Mongol origin; akin to Turkish çuha "cloth". A long-sleeved long-skirted cloak for men worn mainly in India and Pakistan.
Chouse
perhaps from Turkish çavuş "a doorkeeper, messenger"
Coffee
from Ottoman Turkish kahve via Italian caffè
Corsac
from Russian korsak, from Kirghiz karsak, "a small yellowish brown bushy-tailed fox"
Cosaque
from French, literally, "Cossack", from Russian Kazak & Ukrainian kozak, which is from Turkic Kazak. A cracker.
Cossack
from Turkic quzzaq which means "adventurer, guerilla, nomad" (Cossack on wiktionary)

== D ==
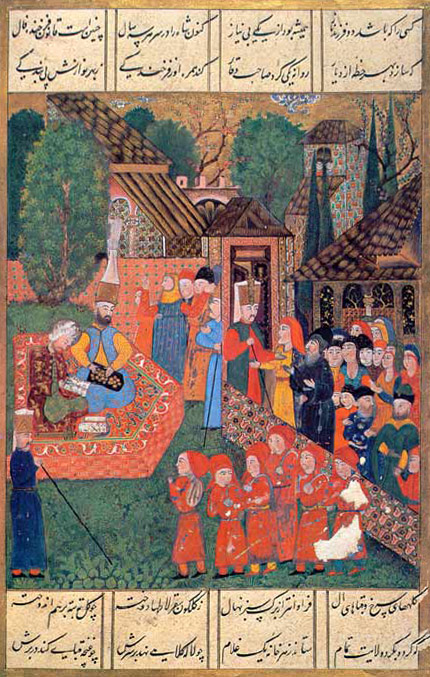
Registration of boys for the devshirmeh

Desemer
from German, from Low German, alteration of Middle Low German bisemer, besemer, of Baltic origin; akin to Lithuanian bezmnas, of Slavic origin; akin to Old Russian bezmenu "desemer, small weight", Polish bezmian, przezmian "balance without pans", perhaps of Turkic origin; akin to Turkish batman "small weight". An ancient balance.
Devshirmeh
from Turkish devşirme, which means "gathering"
Dey
from Turkish dayı, literally "a maternal uncle"
Dolma
from Turkish dolma, which means "filled" or "stuffed"
Dolman
ultimately from Turkish dolaman, a robe, from dolamak "to wind"
Dolmus, also Dolmush
from Turkish dolmuş, a share taxi
Domra
from Kazakh dombra, a musical instrument
Doner kebab
(Canadian: donair) from Turkish döner kebap
Donmeh
from Turkish dönme, which literally means "a convert"
Donum
from Turkish dönüm, an alternative form of dunam
Doodle
from German dudeln "to play (the bagpipe)", from dudel "a bagpipe", from Czech or Polish dudy "a bagpipe", from Turkish düdük "a flute".
Dunam
from Turkish dönüm, from dönmek "go round"

== E ==
Elchee or elchi
from Turkish elçi, which means "an ambassador".
Eleme figs
from Turkish eleme "selected, sifted". Smyrna figs of superior quality packed flat.

== F ==
Fez
from Turkish fes

== G ==
Galiongee
from Turkish kalyonçi, kalyoncu, "a Turkish sailor", from kalyon, Italian galeone + çi or cu, the Turkish suffix.
Ganch
modification of Turkish kancalamak "to put on a hook", from Turkish kanca "large hook", modification of Greek gampsos "curved" + Turkish suffix -lamak.
Giaour
from Turkish gâvur
Gilet
from French, from Spanish gileco, jaleco, chaleco, from Arabic jalikah, "a garment worn by slaves in Algeria", from Turkish yelek "waistcoat, vest"

== H ==
Hajduk
from Ottoman Turkish haydut, "bandit, soldier"
Harambaša
from Turkish haramibaşı, "bandit leader" (from harami, "bandit" + baş, "head")
Haremlik
from Turkish haremlik, from harem (from Arabic harim & Arabic haram) + the Turkish suffix -lik "a place"
Horde
from Turkic ordu or orda ("khan's residence") (Horde on wiktionary)
Hungary
most directly from Latin, ultimately from Turkic, c.f. Onogur.

== I ==
Imam bayildi
from Turkish imambayıldı, "the imam fainted", an eggplant dish prepared with olive oil.
Imbat
from Turkish imbat, a cooling etesian wind in the Levant (as in Cyprus).

== J ==
Janissary
from Turkish yeniçeri, which means "a new soldier" (janissary on wiktionary)
Jelick
from Turkish yelek, the bodice or vest of a Turkish woman's dress.
Jettru
from Turkic, a union of seven Turkic peoples of Central Asia formed at the end of the 17th or beginning of the 18th century under one khan.

== K ==
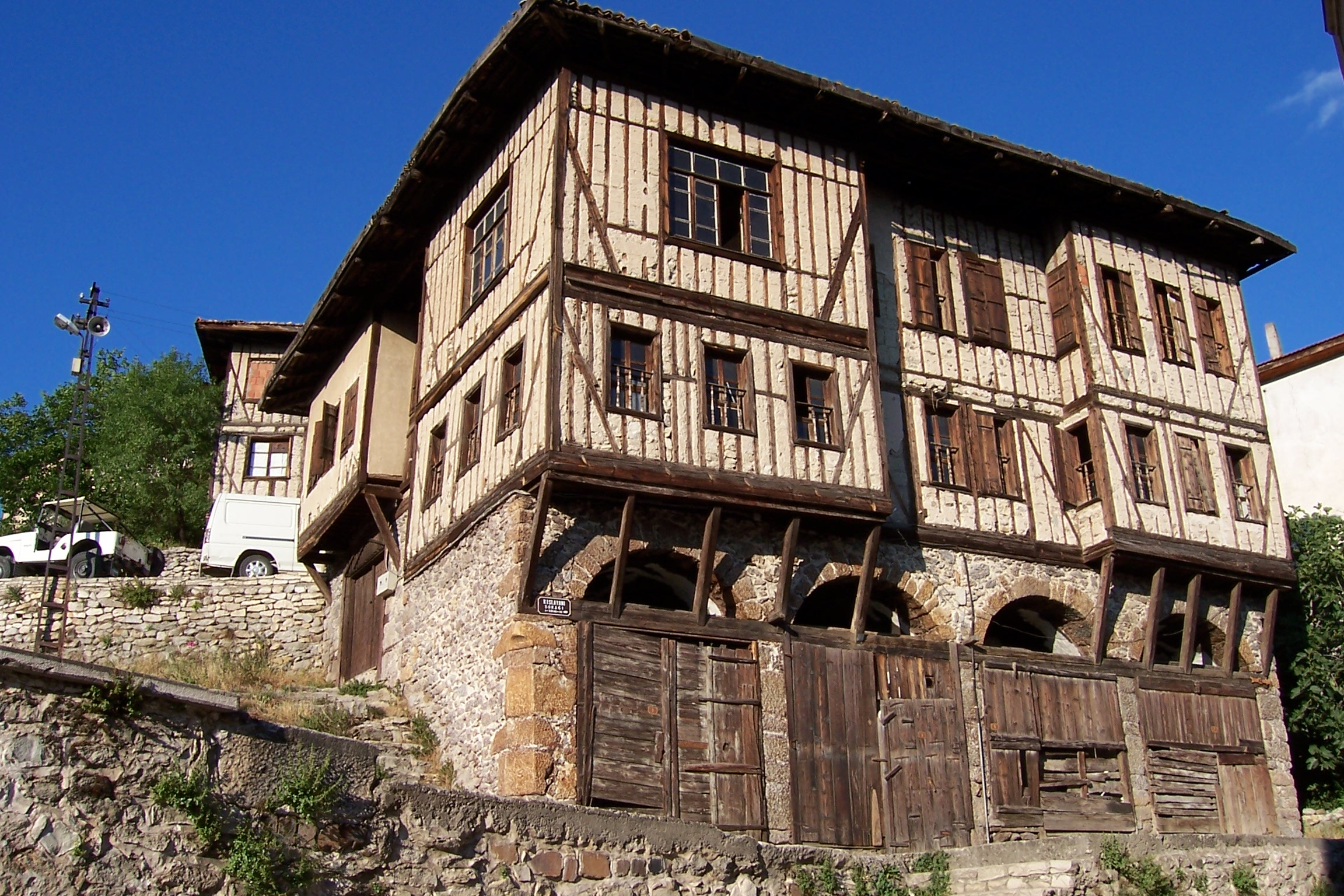
A konak in Safranbolu, Karabük

Kadi
from Ottoman Turkish kadı, "judge"
Kadiluk
from Ottoman Turkish kadıluk, "jurisdiction"
Kaftan
from Turkish kaftan (also in Persian)
Kaique
from Turkish kayık, an alternative form of caïque.
Kalderimi
from Ottoman Turkish kaldırım, "paved road"
Kalpak
from Turkish kalpak
Kangal
from Turkish kangal or sivas kangal köpeği
Karabagh
A type of rug, named after the Karabagh region in the Caucasus.
Karabash
from Turkish karabaş, literally "a blackhead"
Karadagh
from Azerbaijani Karadagh, a mountain range in Azerbaijan province, northwestern Iran. a Persian rug having a bold design and rich coloring.
Karagane
from Russian karagan, which is from Turkic karagan. A species of gray fox found in Russia.
Karakul
from Uzbek karakul, literally a village in Uzbekistan
Karakurt
from Russian, of Turkic origin, karakurt, "a venomous spider".
Kasseri
from New Greek kaseri, from Turkish kaşer, kaşar
Kavass
from Turkish kavas
Kazak
from Kazak, a town in Azerbaijan, an Oriental rug in bold colors with geometric designs or stylized plant and animal forms.
Kefir
from Russian, probably ultimately from Old Turkic köpür, "milk, froth, foam", from köpürmäk, "to froth, foam".
Kelek
from Turkish kelek, a raft or float supported on inflated animal skins.
Kendyr
from Russian kendyr, from Turkish kendir. A strong bast fiber that resembles Indian hemp and is used in Asia as cordage and as a substitute for cotton and hemp.
Ketch
probably from Middle English cacchen "to capture", or perhaps from Turkish kayık "a boat, skiff".
Khagan
from Turkic kaghan, an alternative form of khan
Khan
from Turkic khan, akin to Turkish han (title meaning "ruler")
Khanum
from Turkic khanum, akin to Turkish hanım, "a female derivation of Khan"
Khatun
from Turkic khatūn, perhaps from Old Turkic or from Sogdian kwat'yn, "a queen"
Kibitka
from Russian, of Turkic origin; akin to Kazan Tatar kibit "booth, stall, tent", Uyghur käbit.
Kielbasa
from Polish kiełbasa, from East and West Slavic *kŭlbasa, from East Turkic kül bassï, "grilled cutlet", from Turkic kül bastï : kül, "coals, ashes" + bastï, "pressed (meat)" (from basmaq, to press)
Kilij
from Turkish kılıç, a Turkish saber with a crescent-shaped blade.
Kiosk
from Turkish köşk, an open summerhouse or pavilion
Kipchak
from Russian, which is from Chagatai. 1. One of the ancient Turkic peoples of the Golden Horde related to the Uyghurs and Kyrgyz. 2. The Turkic language of the Kipchaks.
Kis Kilim
from Turkish kızkilim, a kind of carpet.
Kizilbash
from Turkish kızılbaş, literally "a red head"
Knish
from Yiddish, from Ukrainian knysh, probably of Turkic origin.
Kok-saghyz
from Russian kok-sagyz, from Turkic kök-sagız, from kök "root" + sagız "rubber, gum"
Komitadji
from Turkish komitacı, a rebel, member of a secret revolutionary society.
Konak
from Turkish konak, a large house in Turkey.
Krym-saghyz
from Russian krym-sagyz, of Turkic origin, from Krym "Crimea", + sagız "rubber, gum".
Kulah
from Turkish Kula, a town in western Turkey. A Turkish rug that is often a prayer rug and that uses the Ghiordes knot.
Kulak
from Russian kulak "a fist", of Turkic origin; akin to Turkish kol "arm".
Kulan
from Kirghiz kulan, "the wild ass of the Kirghiz steppe".
Kumiss
from Turkic kumyz or kumis (kumiss on wiktionary)
Kurbash
from Turkish kırbaç
Kurgan
from Russian, of Turkic origin; akin to Turkish kurgan "fortress, castle"
Kurus
from Turkish kuruş, a Turkish piaster equal to 1/100 lira.

== L ==
Lackey
from French laquais, from Spanish lacayo, ultimately from Turkish ulak, which means "runner" or "courier".
Ladik
from Turkish Ladik, a village in Turkey. A rug of fine texture woven in and near Ladik in central Anatolia.
Latten
from Middle English latoun, laton, from Middle French laton, leton, from Old Provençal, from Arabic latun, of Turkic origin; akin to Turkish altın "gold"
Lokshen
from Yiddish, plural of loksh "noodle", from Russian dial. loksha, of Turkic origin; akin to Uyghur & Kazan Tatar lakca "noodles", Chuvash läskä.

== M ==
Mammoth
from Russian mamot, mamont, mamant, perhaps from a Yakut word derived from Yakut mamma "earth"; from the belief that the mammoths burrowed in the earth like moles.
Martagon
from Middle English, from Old French, from Old Spanish, from Ottoman Turkish martagan, "a kind of turban".
Merdiban
an accounting method used by the Ottoman Empire, Abbasid empire, and the Ilkhanate; from a word meaning "Ladder" or "Staircase".

== N ==
Nagaika
from Russian, of Turkic origin; akin to Kirghiz nogai

== O ==
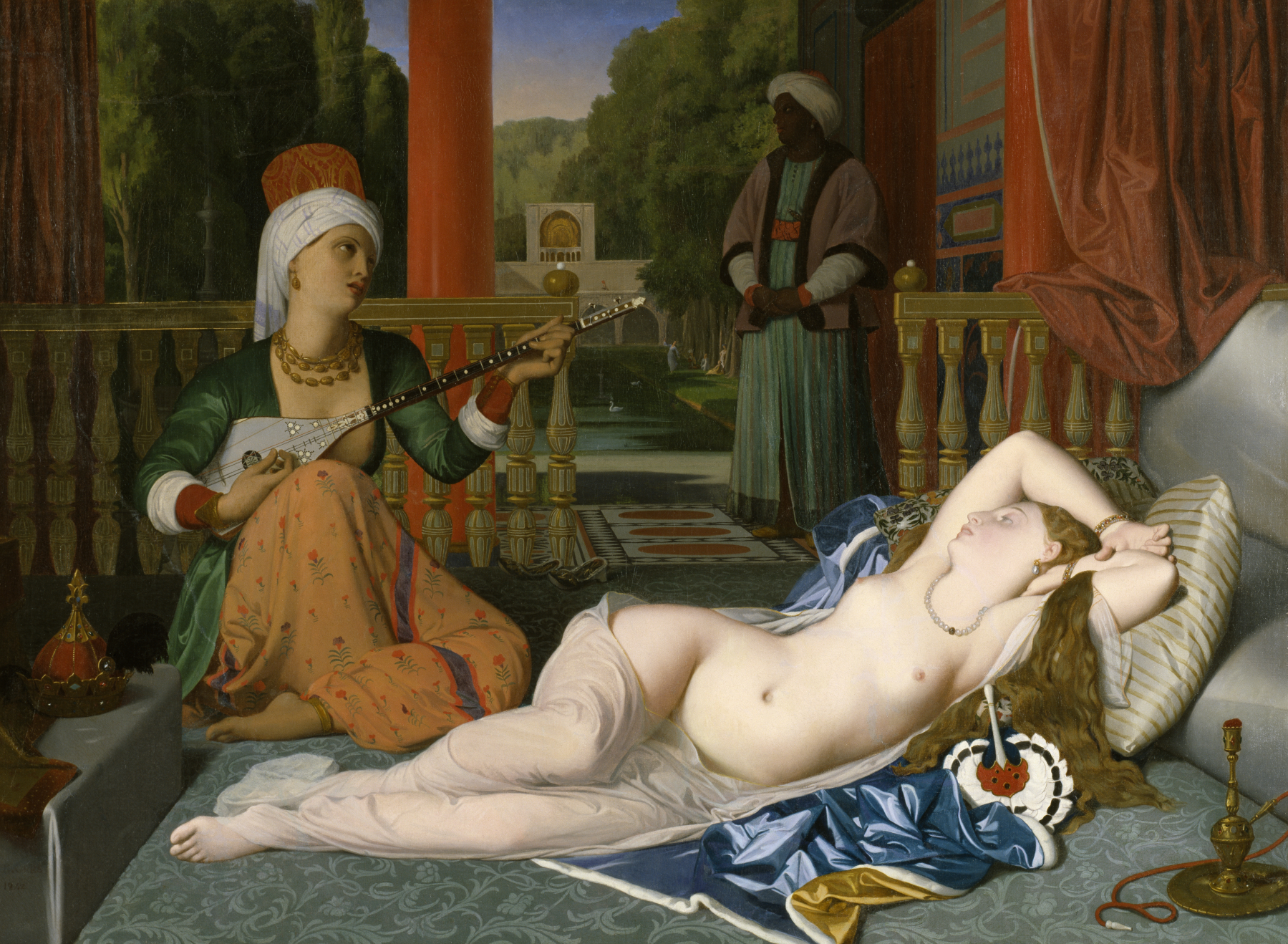
Odalisque with a slave, 1842

Oda
from Turkish oda, literally "a room, chamber". A room in a harem.
Odalisque
from French, which is from Turkish odalık, from oda, "a room"
Oghuz or Ghuz
from Turkic oghuz. A group of Turks from Central Asia.
Osmanli
from Turkish osmanlı, from Osman, founder of the Ottoman Empire + lı "of or pertaining to"
Ottoman
is a form of couch which usually has a head but no back, though sometimes it has neither. It may have square or semicircular ends, and as a rule it is what upholsterers call "overstuffed” — that is to say no wood is visible. In American English, an ottoman is a piece of furniture consisting of a padded, upholstered ...
Ottoman
from French, adjective & noun, probably from Italian ottomano, from Turkish osmani, from Osman, Othman died 1326, founder of the Ottoman Empire

== P ==
Paklava
modification of Turkish baklava
Parandja
from Uzbek, a heavy black horsehair veil worn by women of Central Asia.
Pasha
from Turkish paşa, earlier basha, from bash "head, chief" which equates to "Sir"
Pashalic
from Turkish paşalık, "title or rank of pasha", from paşa: the jurisdiction of a pasha or the territory governed by him
Pastrami
from Yiddish pastrame, from Romanian pastrama, ultimately from Turkish pastırma
Petcheneg
from Russian pecheneg, which is from Turkic. Member of a Turkic people invading the South Russian, Danubian, and Moldavian steppes during the early Middle Ages.
Pilaf
from Turkish pilav, and ultimately from Sanskrit pulāka- (पुलाक), "lump of boiled rice"
Pirogi
from Yiddish, from Russian, plural of pirog (pie), perhaps borrowed from Kazan Tatar, (cf. Turk. börek)
Pul
from Persian pul, which is from Turkish pul. A unit of value of Afghanistan equal to 1/100 Afghani.

== Q ==
Qajar or Kajar
from Persian Qajar, of Turkish origin. A people of northern Iran holding political supremacy through the dynasty ruling Persia from 1794 to 1925.
Quiver
from Anglo-French quiveir, from Old French quivre, probably ultimately from the Hunnic language, kubur in Old Turkic

== R ==
Rumelia
from Turkish Rumeli, "land of Romans"

== S ==
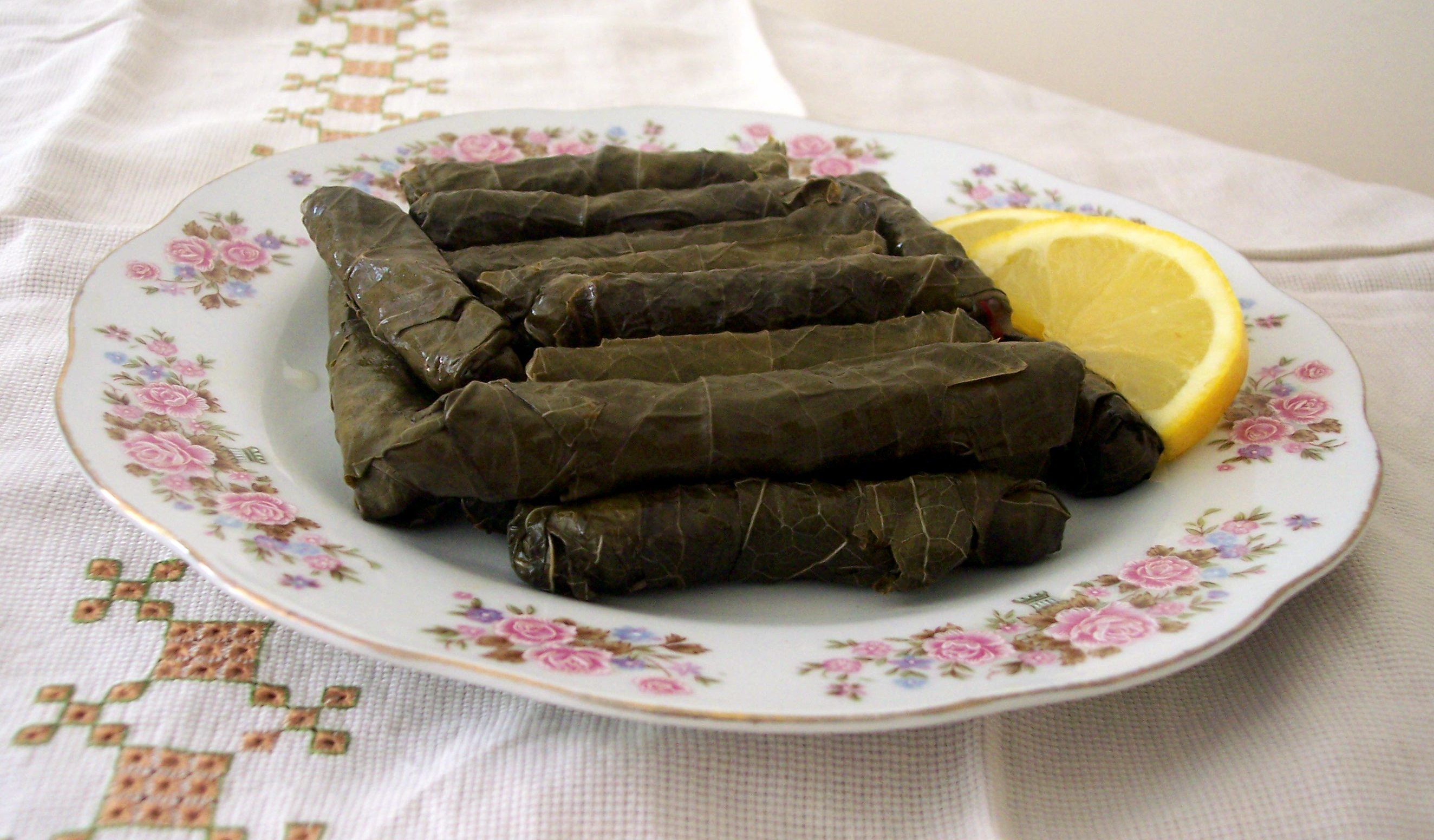
Sarma, a kind of dolma, is a classic of Turkish cuisine.

Sabot
from Old French çabot, alteration of savate "old shoe", probably of Turkish or Arabic origin.
Saic
from French saïque, from Turkish shaika.
Saiga
from Russian saĭgá(k), from Turkic; cf. Chagatai sayğak
Saker
through Old French from Arabic saqr, probably from Turkic sonqur, which means "a falcon".
Samiel
from Turkish samyeli, sam, "poisonous" + yel, "wind".
Sanjak
from Turkish sancak, which means "a banner"
Sarma
from Turkish sarma, which means "wrapping"
Saxaul
from Russian saksaul, which is from Kazakh seksevil. A leafless xerophytic shrub or tree of the family Chenopodiaceae of Asia that has green or greenish branches and is used for stabilization of desert soils.
Selamlik
from Turkish Selamlık.
Seljuk
from Turkish Selçuk, "eponymous ancestor of the dynasties". Of or relating to any of several Turkic dynasties that ruled over a great part of western Asia in the 11th, 12th, and 13th centuries.
Seraskier
from Turkish serasker, from Persian ser "head, chief" + Arabic asker "an army".
Sevdalinka
originally Arabic sawda, via Turkish sevda, "black bile". Genre of Balkan folk-music
Sevruga
through Russian sevryuga ultimately from Tatar söirök.
Shabrack
from French schabraque, from German schabracke, from Hungarian csáprág, from Turkish çaprak
Shagreen
from Turkish sağrı, which means "the back of a horse"
Shaman
from Turkic word šamán.
Shashlik
from Russian шашлык, which is from Crimean Tatar şışlık, which means "shish kebab"
Shawarma
ultimately from Turkish çevirme, which literally means "turning"
Shish
from Turkish şiş, which literally means "a skewer"
Shish kebab
from Turkish şiş kebabı
Shor
from Russian, of Turko-Mongol origin; akin to Kalmyk & Mongolian sor "salt", Turkish sure "brackish soil". A salt lake in Turkestan, a salina.
Som
from Kirghiz, "crude iron casting, ruble"
Sofa
a long upholstered seat with a back and arms, for two or more people.
Sujuk
a dry, spicy and fermented sausage of Central Asian origin; from Turkic word "Sucuk", which is probably derived from "Suɣutçuk" (itself means dried thing or sujuk)

== T ==
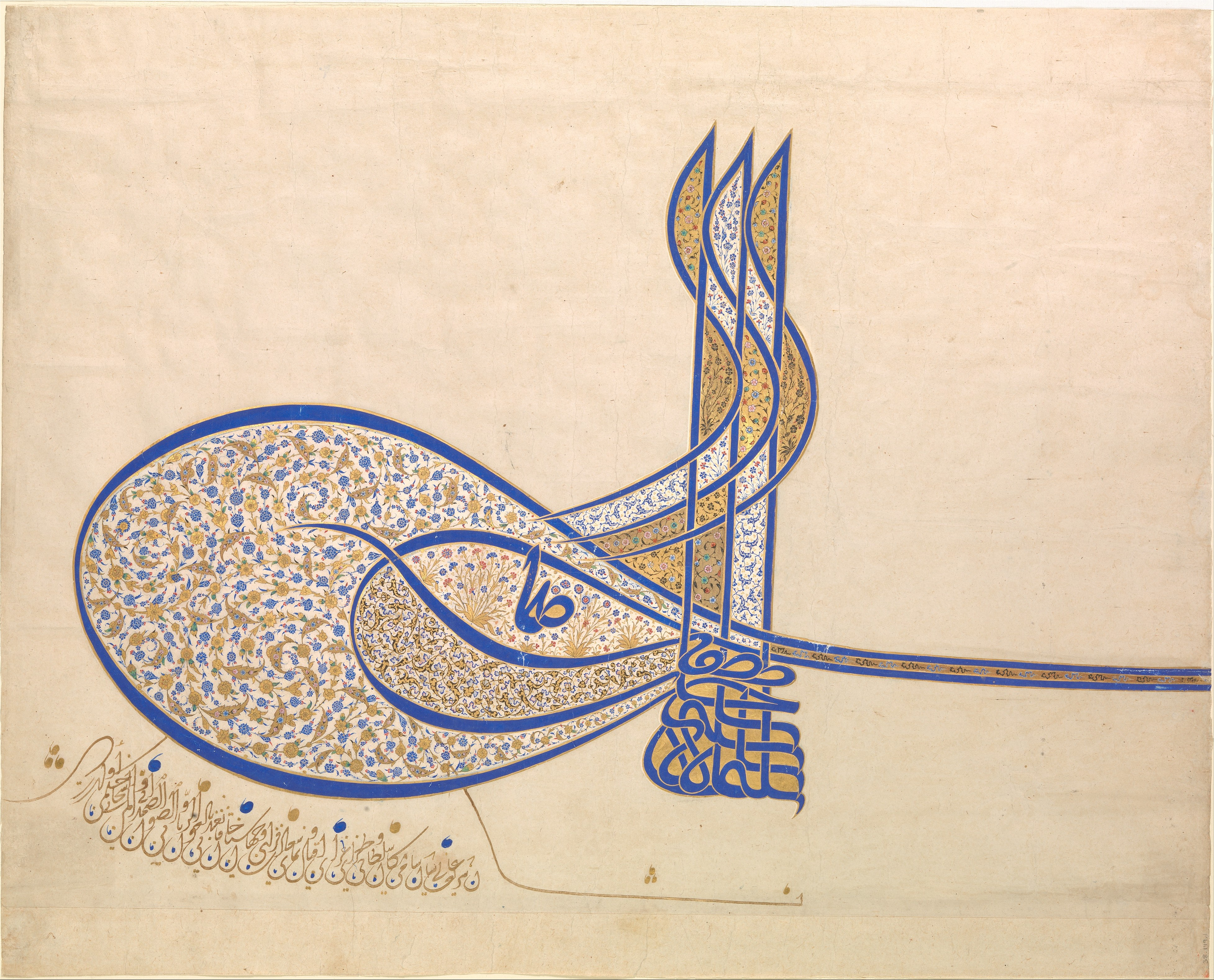
Tughra of Suleiman the Magnificent

Taiga
from Russian taiga, of Turkic origin; akin to Teleut taiga "rocky, mountainous terrain", Turkish dağ "mountain"; Mongolian origin is also possible.
Taramasalata
from modern Greek taramas "preserved roe", from Turkish tarama "preparation of soft roe or red caviar" + salata "salad".
Taranchi
from Chagatai Taranci, literally "a farmer".
Tarantass
from Russian tarantas, which is from Kazan Tatar tarıntas.
Tarbagan
from Russian, which is from Teleut. A rodent
Tarbush
from Arabic tarbūsh, from Ottoman Turkish terposh, probably from Persian sarposh "headdress" (equivalent to sar "head" + pūsh "covering"), by association with Turkish ter "sweat". A tasseled cap of cloth or felt, usually red, that is worn by Muslim men either by itself or as the inner part of the turban.
Tarkhan
from Old Turkic tarkan, a privileged class.
Tarpan
from Russian, which is from Kirghiz or Kazakh tarpan.
Tartar
from Persian Tatar, of Turkic origin. A ferocious or violent person - Latin, from "Tartarus" - evil, hell.
Tau-saghyz
from Russian tau-sagyz, from Turkic tau-sagız, from tau "mountain" + sagız "gum, rubber".
Tavla
from Turkish tavla, a version of the board game backgammon.
Tekke
from Turkish tekke, a dervish monastery.
Tenge
from Kazakh teŋge "coin, ruble".
Tepe
from Turkish tepe, literally "a hill, summit". An artificial mound.
Terek
from Terek, river of southeast Russia, which is from Balkar Terk. A sandpiper of the Old World breeding in the far north of eastern Europe and Asia and migrating to southern Africa and Australia and frequenting rivers.
Theorbo
from Italian tiorba, which is from Turkish torba "a bag".
Toman
from Persian تومان, which is from Turkic tümen, "a unit of ten thousand".
Tovarich
from Russian tovarishch, from Old Russian tovarishch, sing. of tovarishchi, "business associates", which is from Old Turkic tavar ishchi, "businessman, merchant" : tavar, "wealth, trade" + ishchi, "one who works" (from ish, "work, business").
Tughra
from Turkish tuğra, an elaborate monogram formed of the Sultan's name and titles.
Tungus
a member of the Tungusic people; from Russian, from East Turkic tunguz, "wild pig, boar", from Old Turkic tonguz.
Turk
from Turkish türk, which has several meanings in English.
Turki
from Persian turki, from Turk, "Turk", from Turkish Türk.
Turquoise
from Middle English Turkeys, from Anglo-French turkeise, from feminine of turkeis Turkish, from Turc Turkish.
Tuzla
from Turkish tuzla, from the name of Lake Tuz in Turkey. A central Anatolian rug.
Tzatziki
from modern Greek tsatsiki, which is from Turkish cacık.

== U ==
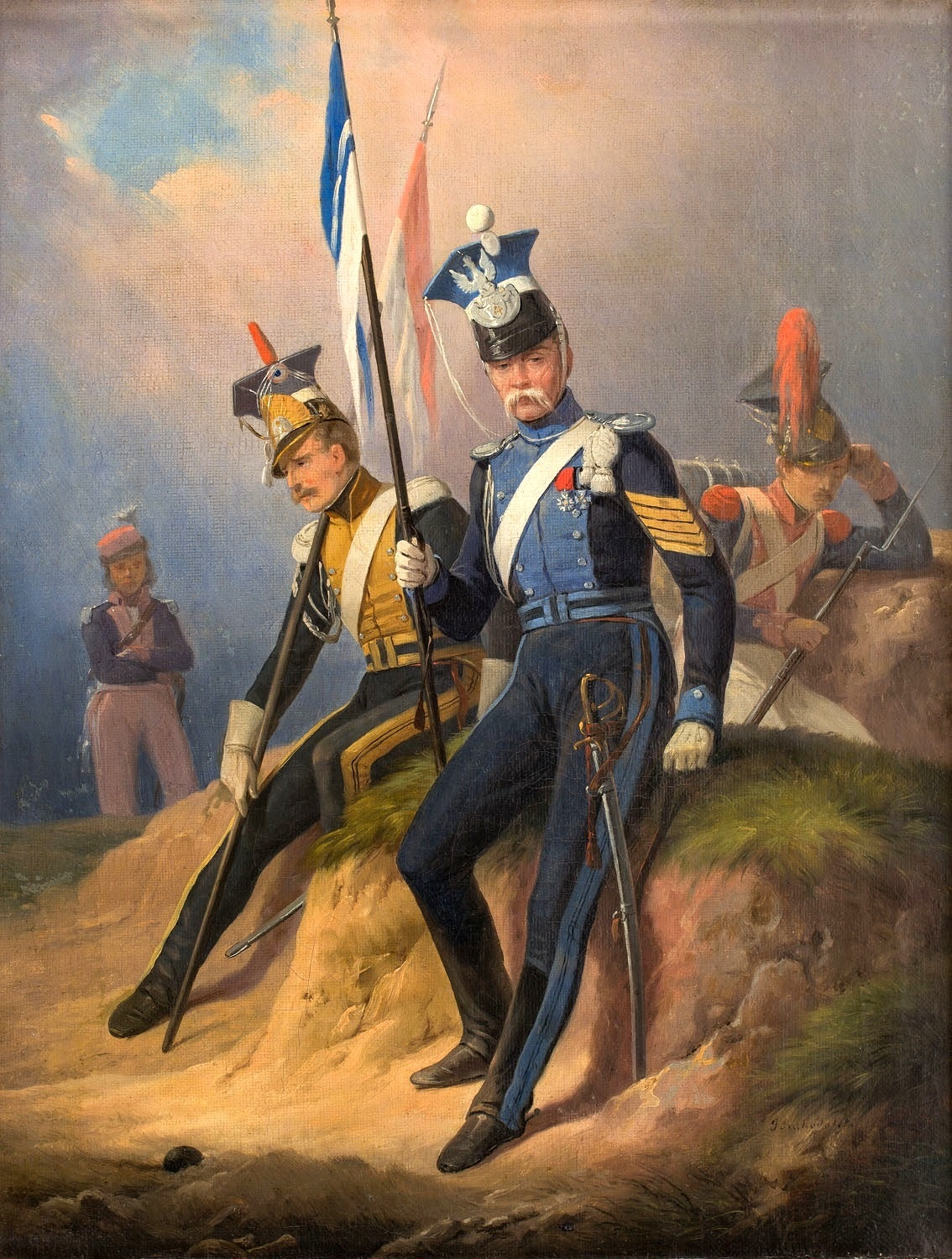
Polish uhlans

Ugrian
from Old Russian Ugre, which means "Hungarians", of Turkic origin.
Uhlan
from Turkish oğlan "a boy, servant".
Urdu
from Hindustani Urdu "camp", which is from Turkic ordu (source of horde).
Urman
from Russian, which is from Kazan Tatar urman, "a forest", synonymous with taiga; Turkish word orman.
Ushak
from Ushak, Turkish Uşak, manufacturing town of western Turkey. A heavy woolen oriental rug tied in Ghiordes knots and characterized by bright primary colors and an elaborate medallion pattern.

== Y ==
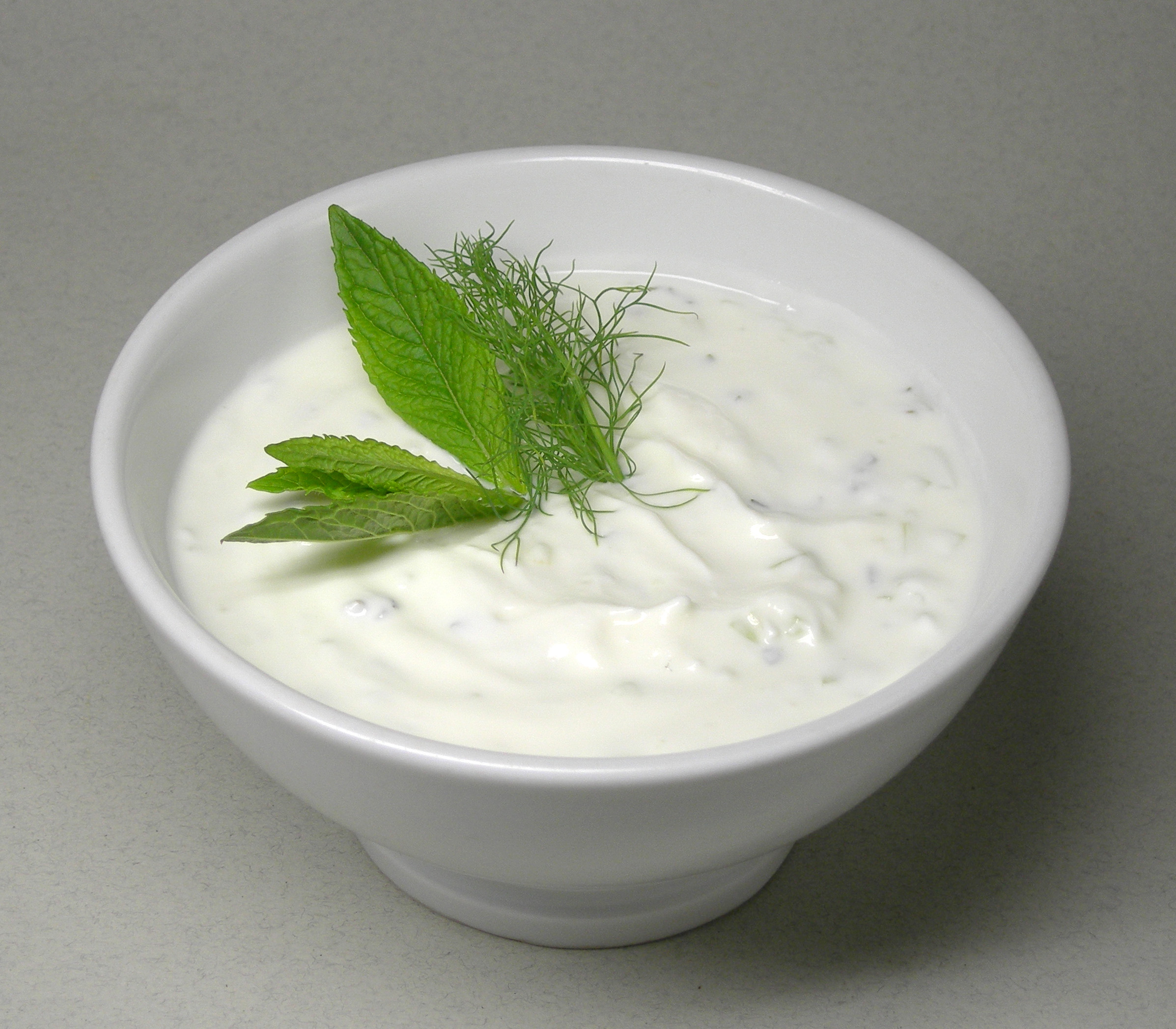
Cacık, a Turkish cold soup yogurt variety

Yardang
from Turkic yardang, ablative of yar "steep bank, precipice".
Yarmulka
of Turkic origin; akin to Turkish yağmurluk which means "rainwear".
Yashmak or yashmac
from Turkish yaşmak.
Yataghan
from Turkish yatağan.
Yogurt
from Turkish yoğurt. (yogurt on wiktionary)
Yurt
from Turkic yurt, which means "a dwelling place".
Yuruk
from Turkish yürük, "a nomad". 1. One of a nomadic shepherd people of the mountains of southeastern Anatolia. 2. A Turkish rug from the Konya and Karaman regions, southeastern Anatolia.

== Z ==
Zill
from Turkish zil "bell, cymbals", of onomatopoeic origin.

== See also ==
- Lists of English words of international origin
