= August Busch =

August Busch may refer to:

- August Anheuser Busch Sr. (1865–1934), 2nd generation brewing magnate
- Gussie Busch (August A. Busch, Jr., 1899–1989), 3rd generation brewing magnate
- August Busch III (born 1937), 4th generation brewing magnate
- August Busch IV (born 1964), 5th generation brewing magnate
- August Ludwig Busch (1804–1855), German astronomer

== See also ==
- Busch (disambiguation)
- Clemens Busch (Clemens August Busch, 1834–1895), German diplomat
