= Skhovaysya =

Ukrainian underground compilation album

Compilation album by various artists
- Released: 1995
- Genre: Experimental rock, avant-folk
- Label: Paradise Delight of Bianca

Skhovaysya (Ukrainian: Сховайся) is a 1995 compilation of Ukrainian independent music cataloging what was later referred to as "novaya scena" among western audiences, who took the name from an Kharkiv musical union of the same name. Interest in the "novaya scena" has grown over the decades, with artists on this compilation seeing reissues and renewed interest both in Ukraine and abroad.

The sound of Skhovaysya is a diverse collection of avant-garde music, split between ethereal folk and experimental rock music.

The compilation is considered one of the greatest compilations of work from this period of Ukrainian underground music, both by critics and artists involved. It has preserved rare tracks and the work of artists with limited other surviving material.

== Track listing ==
Side A
No.	Title	Artist	Length
1.	"Fake"	M. Springer & S. Ohrimenko
2.	"The Pattern on the Door"	Yarn
3.	"Глиняный кубок для девушки с золотыми волосами"	Kazma-Kazma
4.	"III Episode From Original Performed Sound Track "Transilvania Smile""	Svitlana Ohrimenko
5.	"Untitled"	Kvitchala v Serpni
6.	"Бареска"	Verba Hlyos
7.	"Untitled"	Kvitchala v Serpni
8.	"No.27"	Igra

Side B
No.	Title	Artist	Length
1.	"I Episode From Original Performed Sound Track "Transilvania Smile""	Svitlana Ohrimenko
2.	"Udo Didn't Getto Ghetto"	Radiodelo
3.	"Улыбнись"	Inga Blazhchuk
4.	"Notaricon"	Inga Blazhchuk
5.	"La Volta"	Yarn
6.	"Вбрання"	Merta Zara
7.	"Королева Ла-Той-Сы"	Vadim Yugrinov & Mazur Sisters
8.	"Без названия"	Vadim Yugrinov & Mazur Sisters
9.	"Бананы круглый год"	Shake Hi-Fi
