= Ihor Tsymbrovsky =

Ukrainian architect, poet and musician

- Ігор Цимбровський
- Born: 1962 (age 63–64)
- Occupations: Architect; Poet; Musician

Ihor Tsymbrovsky (Note: Ukrainian: Ігор Цимбровський, romanized: Ihor Tsymbrovskyi; Polish: Ihor Cymbrows'kyj) (born 1962) is a Ukrainian architect, poet and musician from Lviv.

In 1995, Tsymbrovsky created the album Come, Angel (Ukrainian: Прийди, янголе; Pryydy, yanhole), which was released on the Polish label Koka Records in 1996. Come, Angel and Tsymbrovsky's work received renewed attention in the 2010s in Ukraine and abroad, leading to an abridged reissue on Offen Records in 2016 and a full reissue on Kontakt Audio and Infinite Fog in 2022. The Kontakt/Infinite Fog reissue also includes Tsymbrovsky's performance at the 1997 Music the World Does Not See festival (Polish: Muzyka jakiej świat nie widzi), where Cukor Bila Smerť, Svitlana Nianio and Polish avant-folk group Księżyc also performed.
