= Boche =

Boche may refer to:

- Boche (slur), a pejorative term for Germans

== People ==
- Aurélien Boche (born 1981), French footballer
- Bruno Boche (1897–1972), German field hockey player
- Robert M. Boche (1921–2004), American politician

== See also ==
- Boch (disambiguation)
- Boce (disambiguation), for the terms Boće and Boçe
- Bosch (disambiguation)
- Bosh (disambiguation)
- Boshe, a village in China
- Edward Boches, an American academic
