= Ushak carpet =

Type of carpet associated with Ushak, Turkey

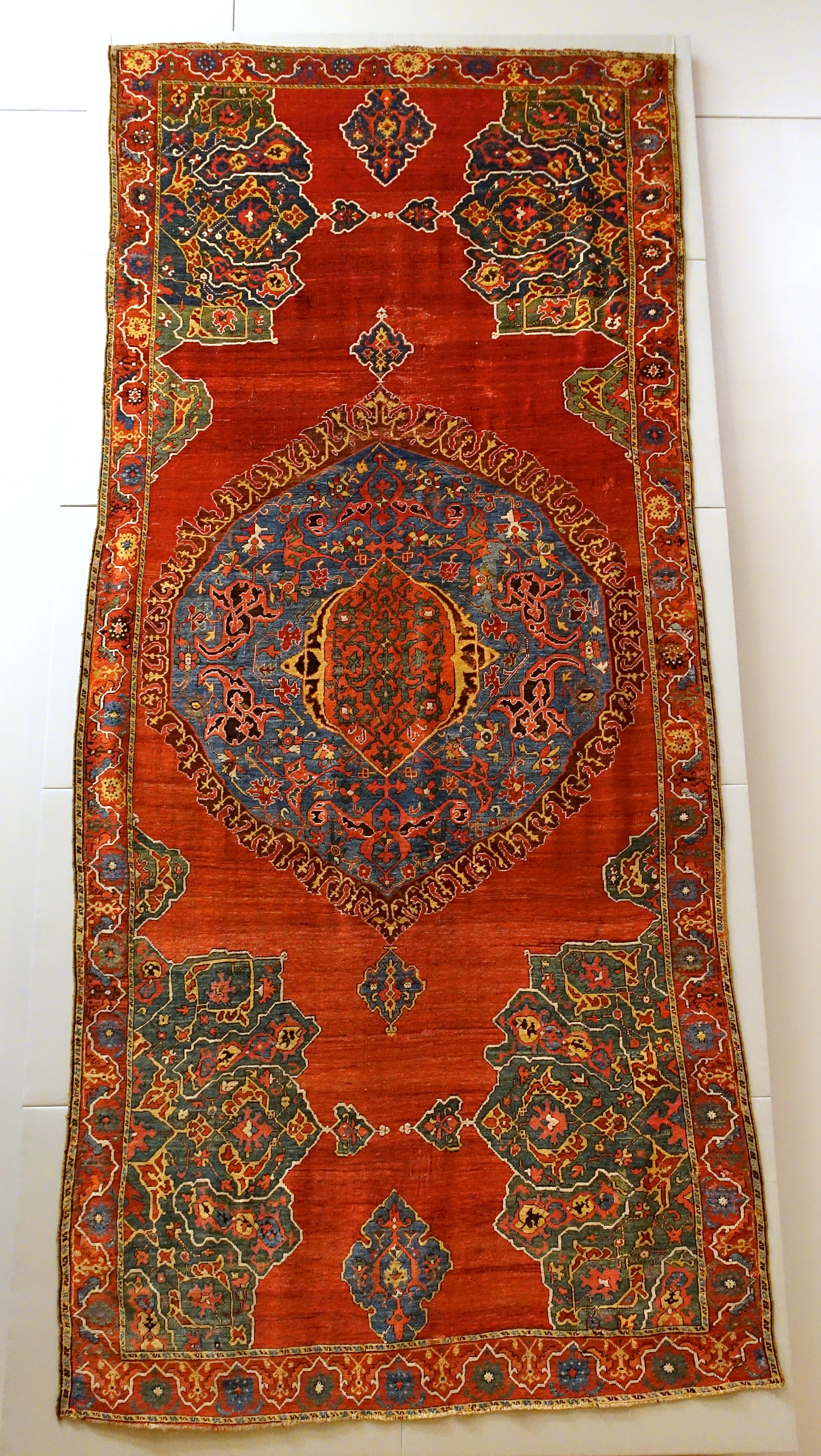
Ushak carpet with central medallion, c. 1650-1700. George Washington University Museum and Textile Museum

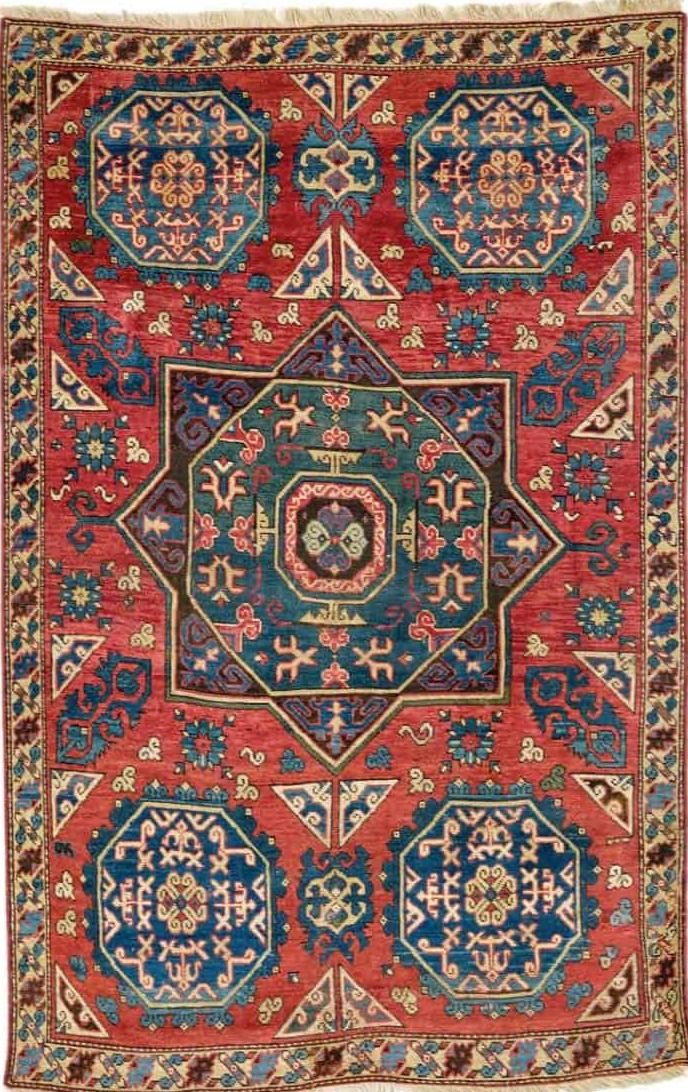
West Anatolian Star Medallion Carpet, ca.1500-1550, one of the oldest known. Ushak?

Uşak carpets, Ushak carpets or Oushak Carpets (Turkish: Uşak Halısı) are Turkish carpets that use a particular family of designs, called by convention after the city of Uşak, Turkey – one of the larger towns in Western Anatolia, which was a major center of rug production from the early days of the Ottoman Empire, into the early 20th century (although these patterns were woven in other regions also).

== Classification ==
Historically Ushaks were classified as ‘Anatolian Rugs,’ Anatolian literally translating to ‘land of the rising sun.’ Today scholars know much more about Oushaks and are able to classify them as such. ‘Anatolian’ is used as a last resort when a more specific identification cannot be found; at which point ‘Anatolian’ refers to a carpet made in Turkey.

The level of international popularity attained by Uşak's carpets became such that the word "Ushak" is considered an English word of Turkic origin

=== In the European market ===
In the European markets, the earlier types of Turkish carpets, before the "star" type, are now often called "Lotto carpets" and "Holbein carpets". The terms make reference to their depiction in minute detail in paintings by Lorenzo Lotto and Hans Holbein the Younger, in which they are often placed in a way to brighten the background, and suggest status. The region of Uşak still remains a vibrant center of hand-made carpet weaving today.

=== In the American market ===
Many Turkish rug companies make products for customers in the United States. They manufacture carpets and rugs in Turkey and distribute them to American markets through major retailers and online channels. Most of the rugs are machine-made yet designed with a traditional Ushak look.

== History of market popularity ==
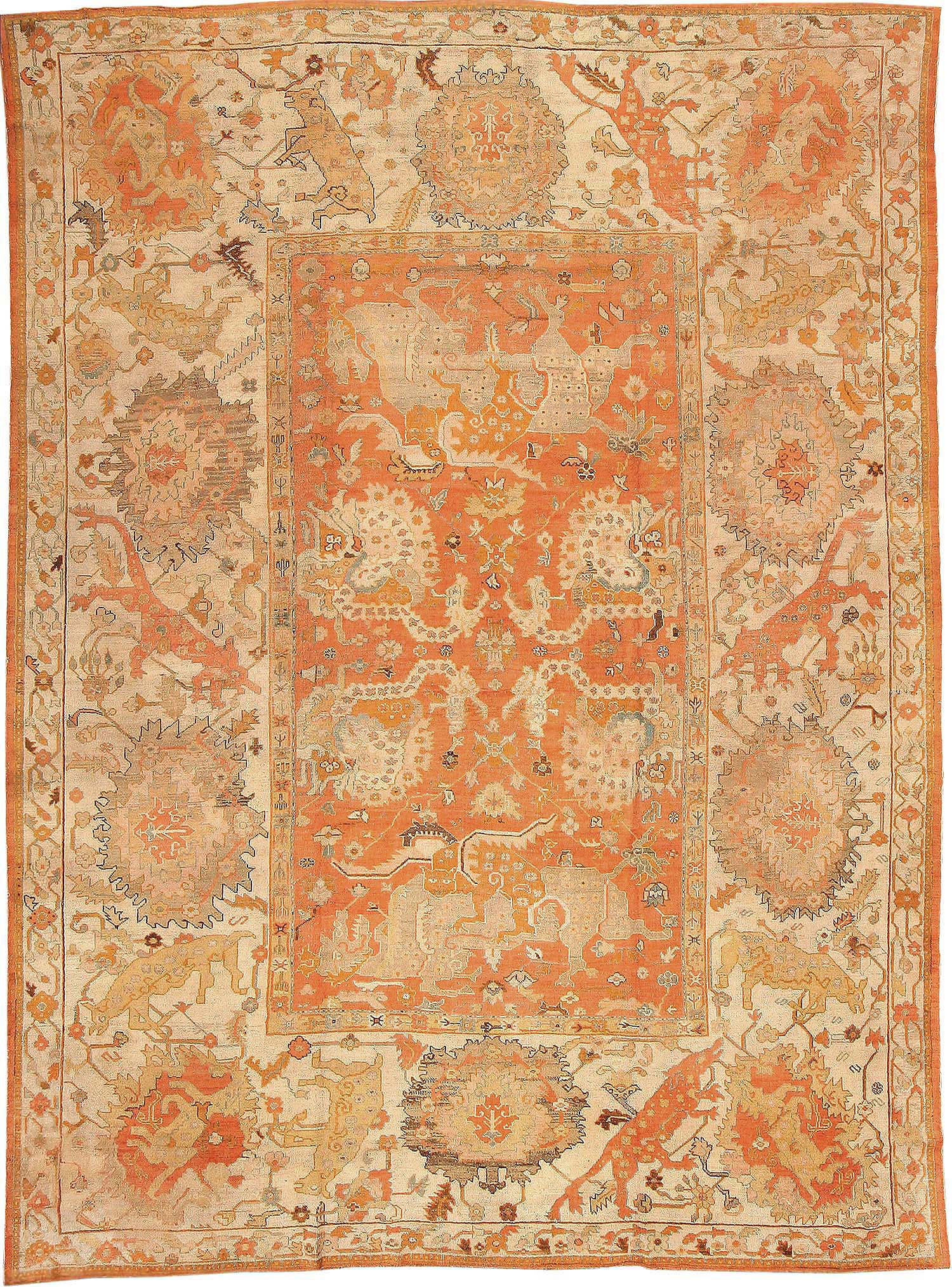
A classic antique Oushak. Four sinuous dragons rotate about the center of the rich apricot field, while above and below them winged lions pounce on larger fantastic creatures.

After the 17th century, Ushaks (Ovshaks), development of Oushak rug weaving is less well known. Late 17th century saw a decline in the Oriental rug market as European consumers tended to purchase rugs of European origin – primarily Aubusson, Savonnerie and Axminster. The wane in the European market meant that Ovshak production declined. Those that were still made throughout the late 18th and early 19th centuries were manufactured for upper-class people in the Turkish territories on Eastern Europe.

Towards the end of the 19th century, when the European market began to be interested in Persian carpets once again, the Ushak (Ovshak) population did not have enough weavers still skilled in the traditional Ovshak craft. Manufactories had to turn to neighboring villages and their craftsmen who still maintained traditional techniques.

Ushak carpets, particularly those known as Lotto carpets, are among the later types of Oriental carpets in Renaissance painting, as they were imported by Europeans, where they adorned cathedrals, churches, and the homes of the wealthy and powerful.

== Design ==
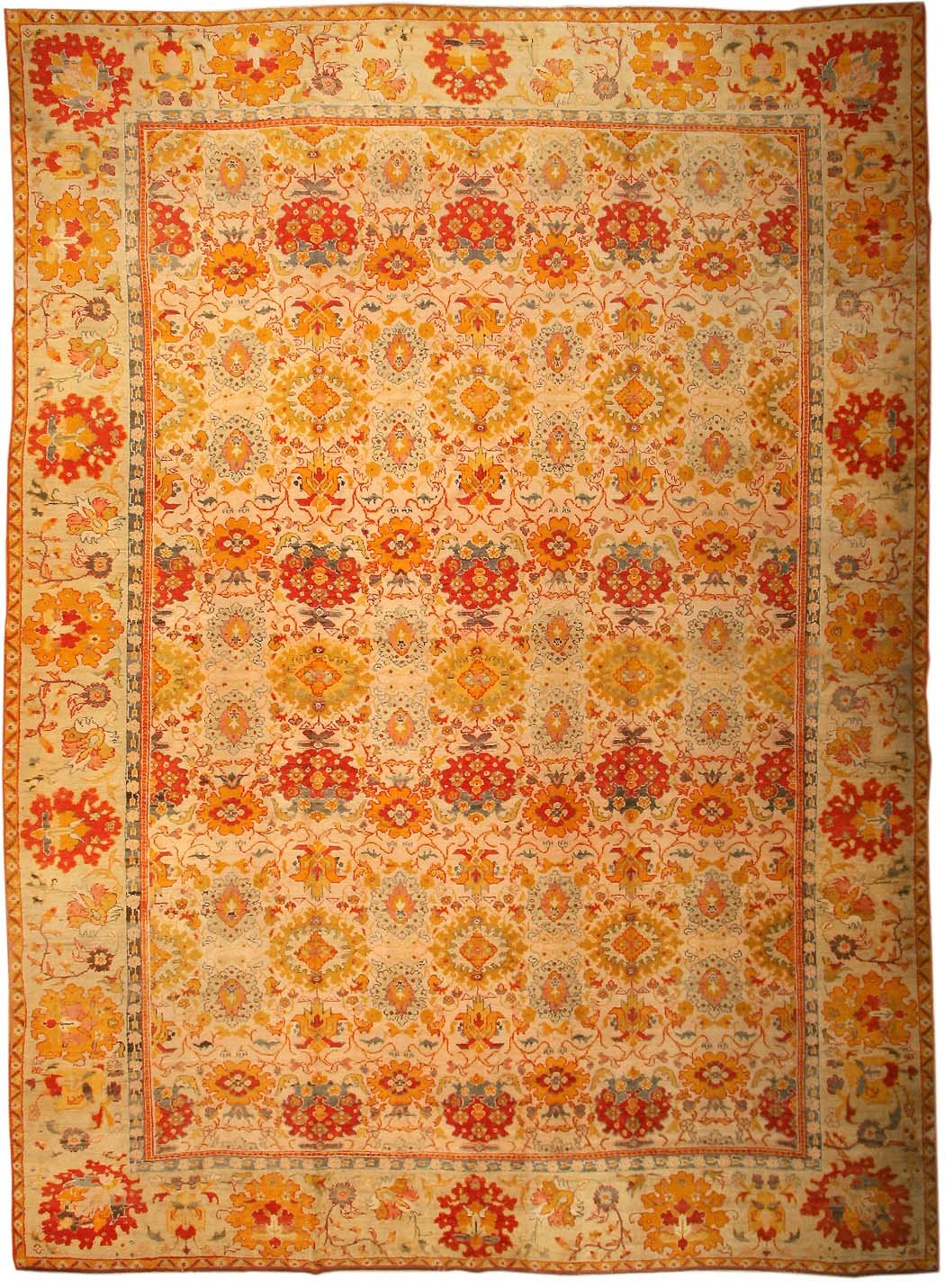
Antique Oushak carpet

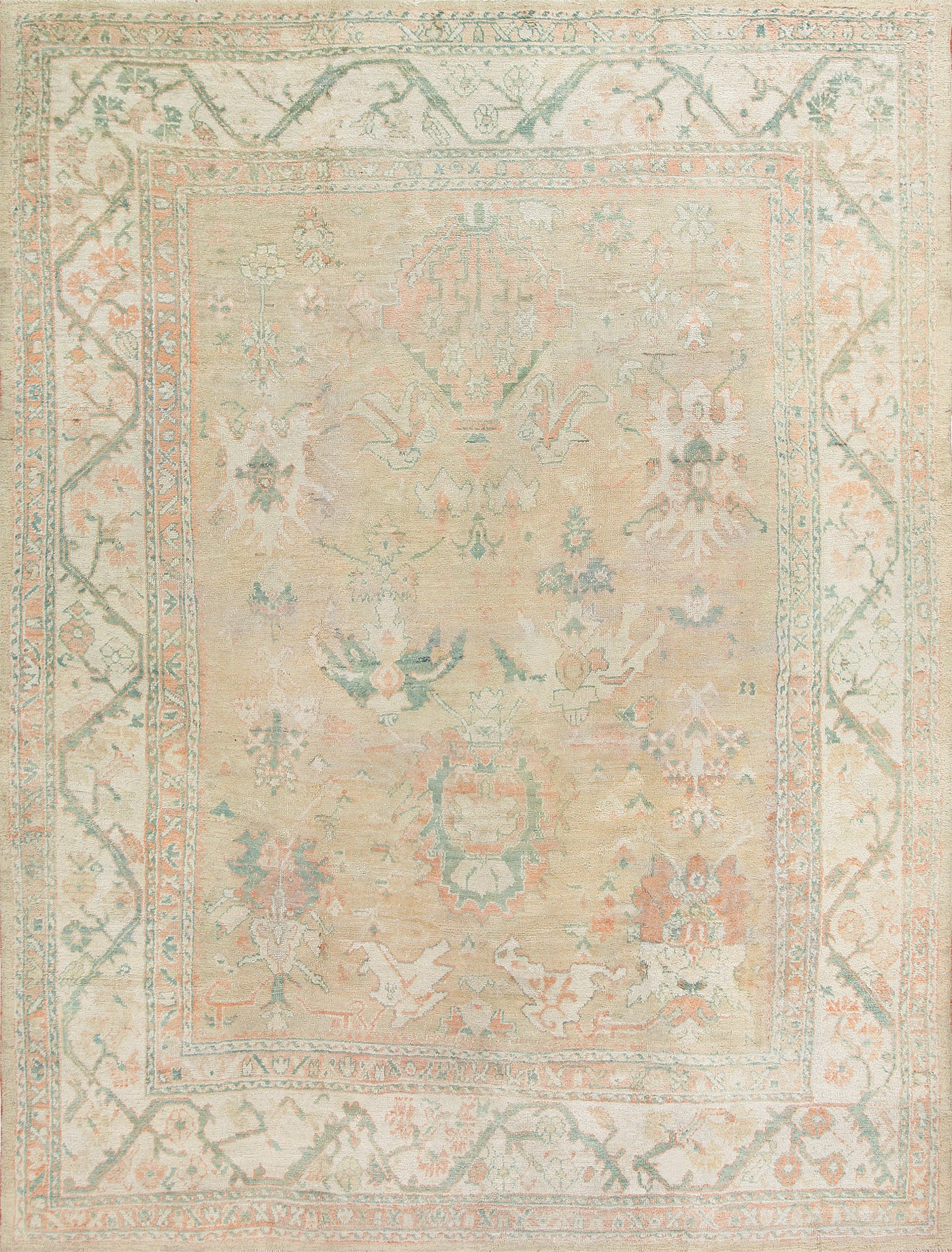
The artistic knotting techniques of the Oushak produce a unique carpet.

Ushak (Oushak) rugs are some of the finest Oriental Rugs, so much so that many of the masterpieces of the 15th and 16th centuries have been attributed to Oushak. The popular star and medallion carpets originated in Oushak.

Oushak rugs are known for the silky, luminous wool they work with. The dyes tend towards: cinnamons, terracotta tints, gold, blues, greens, ivory, saffron and grays.

The late 19th century saw the rejuvenation of Oriental rug production, at this time Oushak re-surfaced as a preeminent center of weaving industry. The new Oushak industry saw two major shifts in design: floral patterns in the Persian tradition were incorporated into design and room size, decorative carpets were woven as European standards demanded.

The late 19th century weavers came from villages outside of Oushak and employed tribal techniques. Paramount to these techniques was the use of larger knots (sometimes less than 30 knots per square inch) and an all-wool foundation. The tribal style fused with the older Ushak/Smyra designs. The merger of the two styles created a new style simply known as late 19th/early 20th century Oushak carpets. The new decorative Oushak, commercially woven, employed a soft red, as its primary color offsetting the large-scale floral motifs from the field in a bright blue. The luxurious quality of the wool (for which Oushaks had always been known) aided the colors' luminosity.

== Istanbul mosques and Ushak carpets ==
Approximately 40 years ago anthropologists did a study on the carpets of the larger mosques of Istanbul (such as the Sultan Ahmet Mosque). What they found was that the floors were covered with hundreds of carpets (sometimes several deep) almost exclusively from the Oushak region.
