= Kazma (disambiguation) =

Kazma is a city in Kuwait.

Kazma may also refer to:

- Kazma Sakamoto (born 1982), Japanese professional wrestler and manager
- Ömer Ali Kazma, Turkish video artist
- Kazma, nickname of Kamil Bartošek (born 1985), Czech producer and film director of ONEMANSHOW: The Movie
- King Kazma, a fictional character in the Japanese animated science fiction film Summer Wars
- Kazma SC, Kuwaiti football (soccer) club based in Kazma, Kuwait

== See also ==
- Qazma, also Kazma or Kazmatabun, village in Azerbaijan
- Kazma-Kazma, Ukrainian avant-garde musical group
