= Busch =

Busch may refer to:

== People ==
- Busch (surname)

== Places ==
- Busch (Ortsteile), a subdivision of the municipality of Odenthal, Germany
- Busch, Missouri, a ghost town in the United States
- Germán Busch Province, Santa Cruz Department, Bolivia
  - Puerto Busch, located in Germán Busch Province

== Other uses ==
- Anheuser-Busch, brewery
  - Busch beer, one of Anheuser-Busch's product lines
- Busch Campus (Rutgers University)
- Busch Gardens, theme park
- Busch Series, former Name for NASCAR's Number two series now called the Xfinity Series
- Busch Stadium, a stadium in the US city of St. Louis, Missouri; home of the St. Louis Cardinals baseball team
- Busch Quartet, a string quartet led by Adolf Busch
- FV Carl J. Busch, a German fishing vessel in service 1935-39 and 1945–56, served as a vorpostenboot and weather ship during World War II

== See also ==
- Bush (surname)
- Bausch
