= Lotto carpet =

Carpet having a lacy arabesque pattern

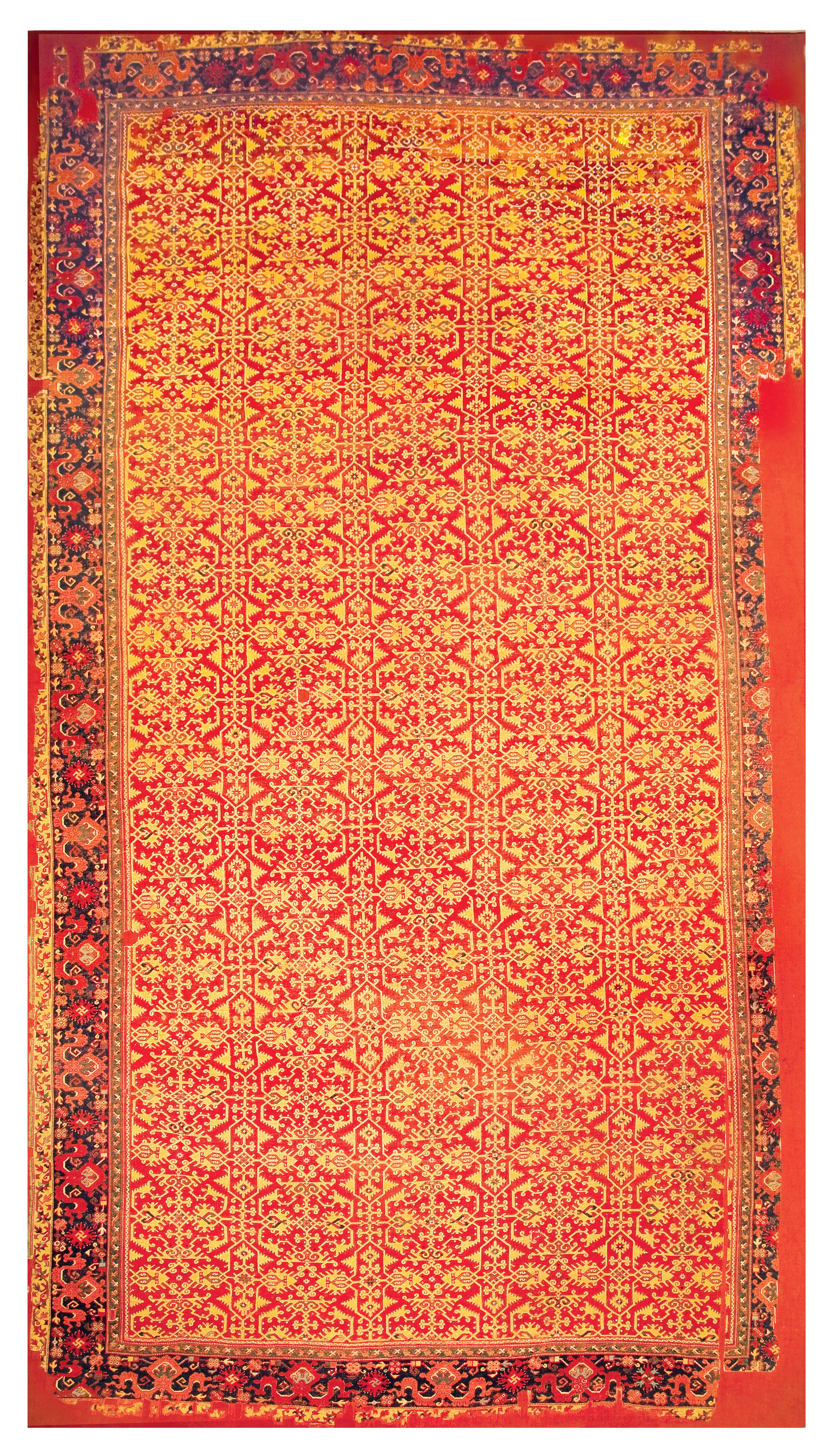
Lotto carpet, Uşak region, 16th century. Turkish and Islamic Arts Museum

A Lotto carpet is a hand-knotted, patterned Turkish carpet that was produced primarily during the 16th and 17th centuries along the Aegean coast of Anatolia, Turkey, although it was also copied in various parts of Europe. It is characterized by a lacy arabesque, usually in yellow on a red ground, often with blue details. The name "Lotto carpet" refers to the inclusion of carpets with this pattern in paintings by the 16th-century Venetian painter Lorenzo Lotto, although they appear in many earlier Oriental carpets in Renaissance painting.

== Overview ==
Lotto carpets used to be known as "Small-pattern Holbein Type II" by Western scholars, but Holbein never painted one, unlike Lorenzo Lotto who did so several times (although he was not the first artist to do so). Lotto is also documented as owning a large carpet, though its pattern is unknown. Though they look very different from Holbein Type I carpets, they are a development of the type, where the edges of the motifs take off in rigid arabesques somewhat suggesting foliage, and terminating in branched palmettes. The type was common and long-lasting, and is also known as "Arabesque Ushak". Lotto carpets are also depicted in paintings by Murillo, Willem Key and Zurbarán in the 17th century, and Dutch paintings until the 1660s and sometimes later.

Ellis distinguishes three principle design groups for Lotto carpets: the Anatolian-style, Kilim-style, and ornamental style.

In the 16th and 17th centuries, the designs for Lotto carpets were copied in Italy, Spain, the European part of the Ottoman Empire and in England, and many modern copies have also been produced.

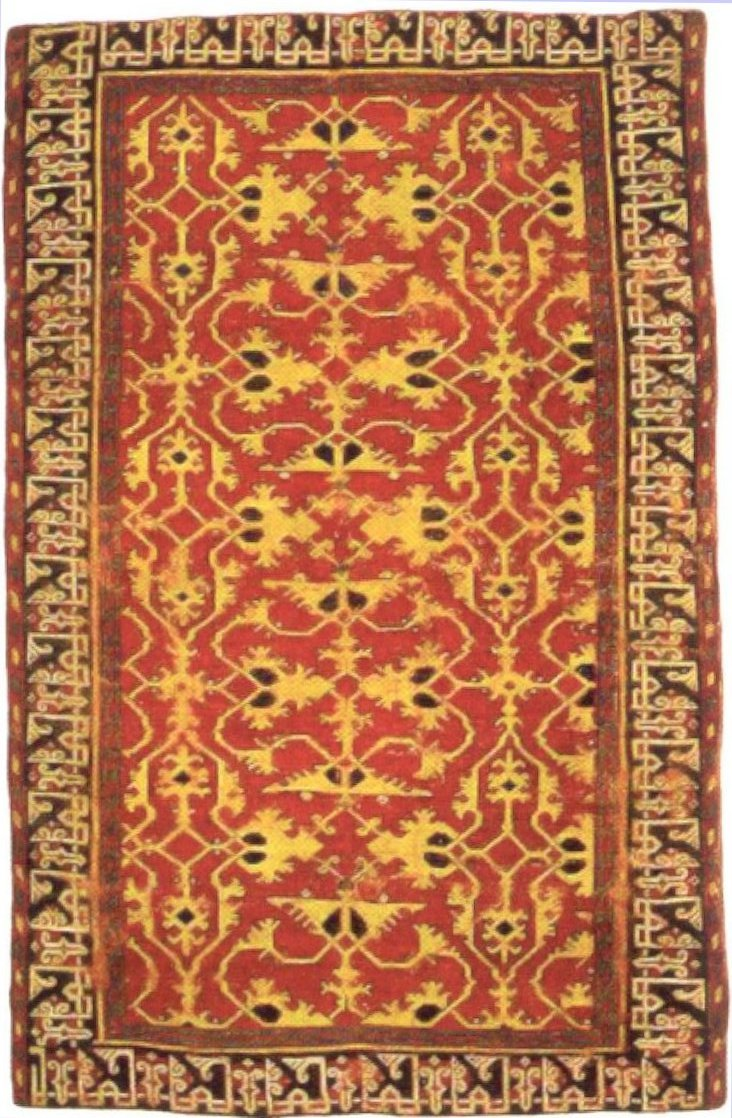
Western Anatolia knotted wool ‘Lotto carpet’, 16th century, Saint Louis Art Museum

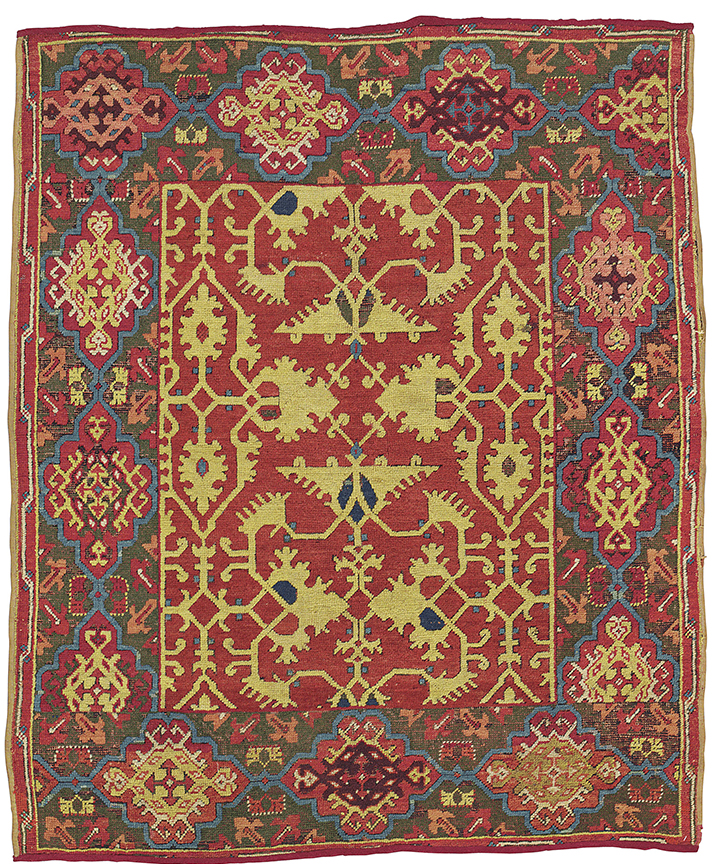
Lotto rug, first half 17th century, offered at auction 2018

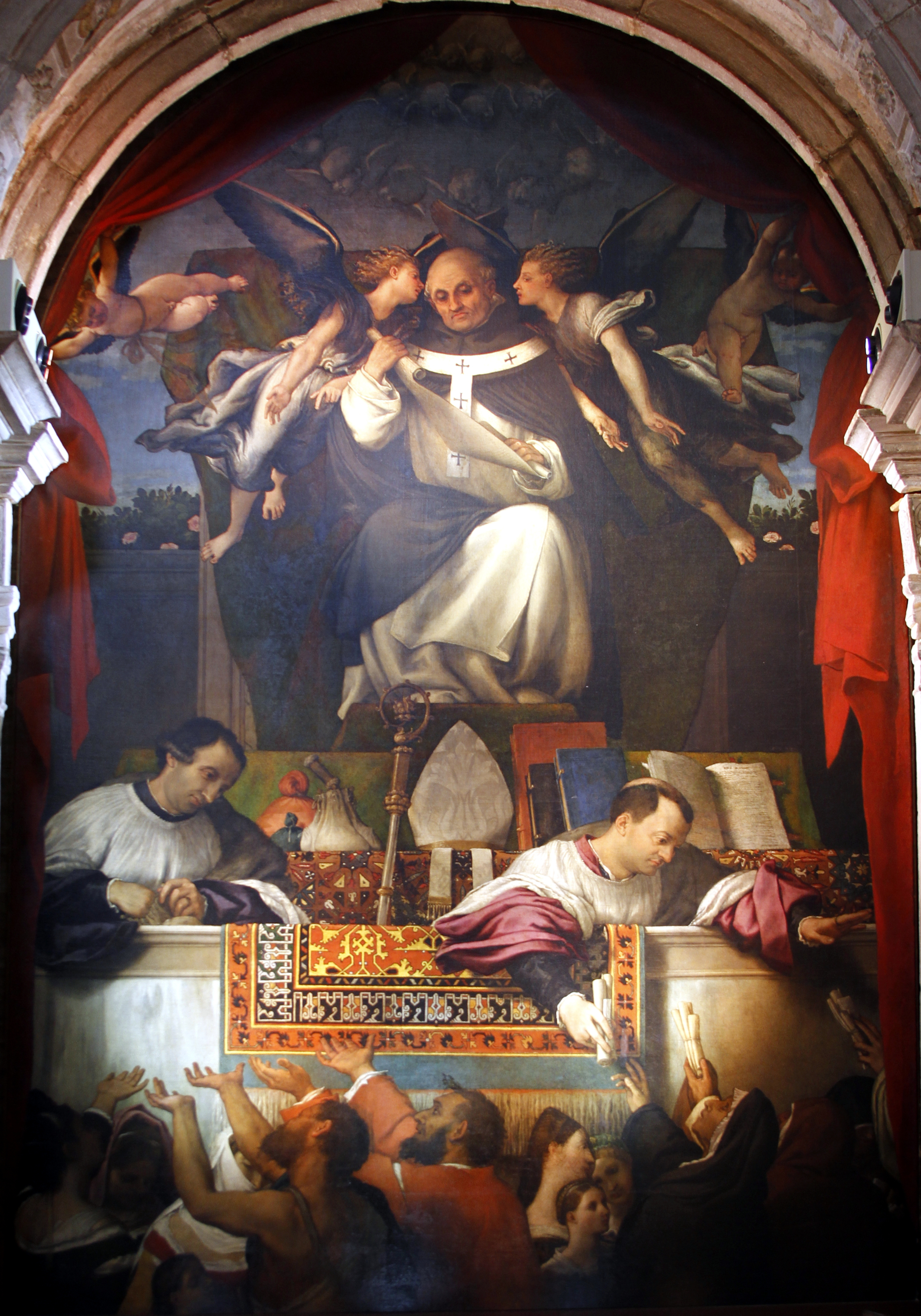
The Alms of St Anthony, oil on wood painting by Lorenzo Lotto, showing a Lotto carpet, 1542

== See also ==
- Oriental carpets in Renaissance painting
