= Boch =

Boch may refer to:

- Anna Boch (1848–1936), Belgian painter
- Cathryn Boch (born 1968), French artist
- Ernie Boch, Jr. (born 1958), American businessman
- Eugène Boch (1855–1941), Belgian painter
- François Boch (1695–1794), a founder of manufacturer Villeroy & Boch
- Hieronymus Bock (1498–1554), German herbalist
- Margot Boch (born 1999), French bobsledder
- Bureau of Cultural Heritage, a government agency in Taiwan
- Villeroy and Boch, German company

== See also ==
- Boche (disambiguation)
