= Borsch (disambiguation) =

Borsch, or borscht, is a soup of East European origin.

Borsch, Borscht, Barszcz, Bœrsch, Borsh or Borshch may also refer to:

- Mike Barz (born Michael Barszcz in 1970), American broadcaster
- Bœrsch, a commune in France
- Borsch (surname) or Börsch, a German surname
- Borsh, a village in Albania
- Viktor Borshch (born 1948), Russian volleyball player
- BORSCHT or BORSHT, a telecommunications technology
- Borscht Corporation, a non-profit filmmaking organization

== See also ==
- Borș (disambiguation)
- Bosch (disambiguation)
- Ostern, or Borscht Western, a film genre
