= Holbein carpet =

Type of Ottoman carpet

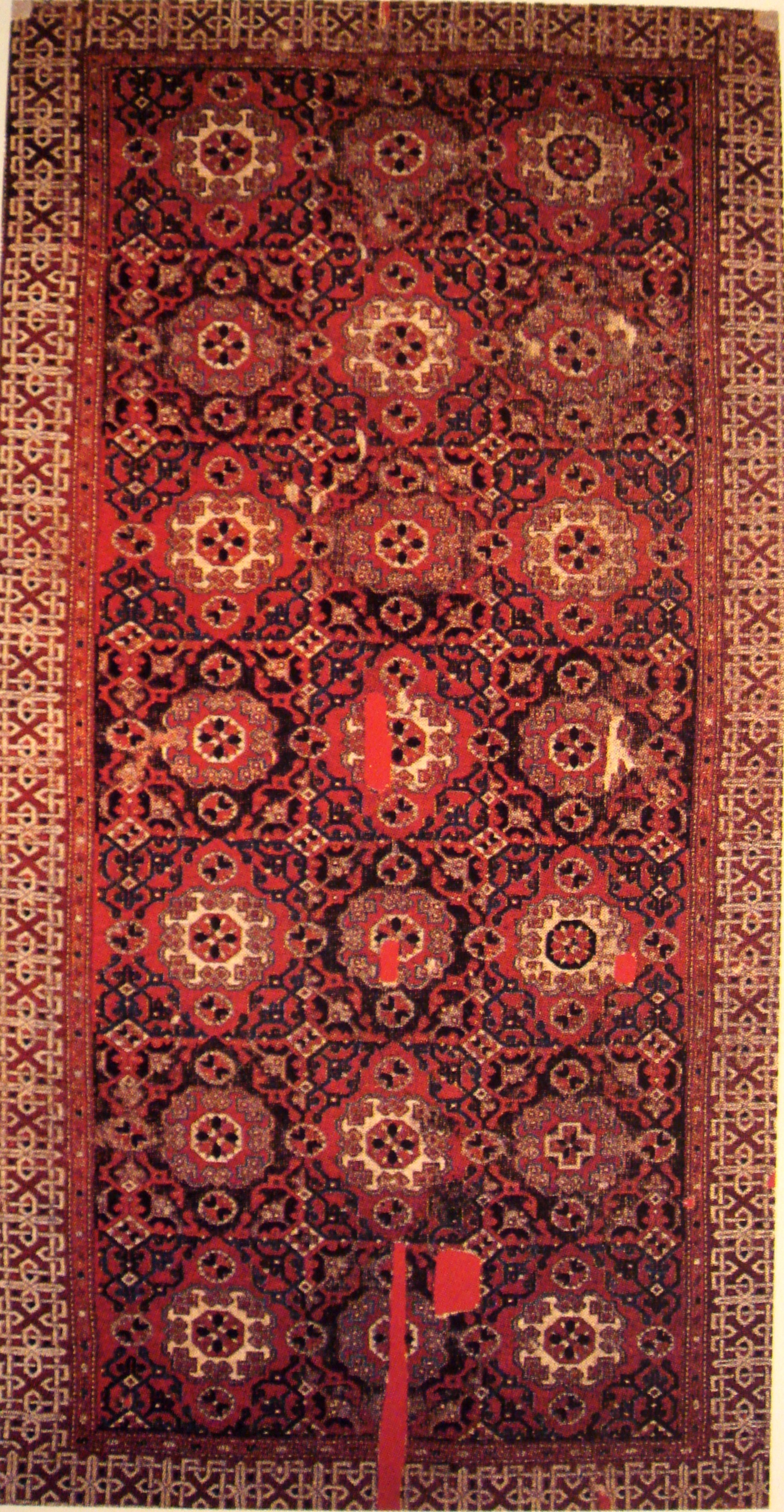
Type I small-pattern Holbein carpet, Anatolia, 16th century. Museum of Islamic Art, Berlin

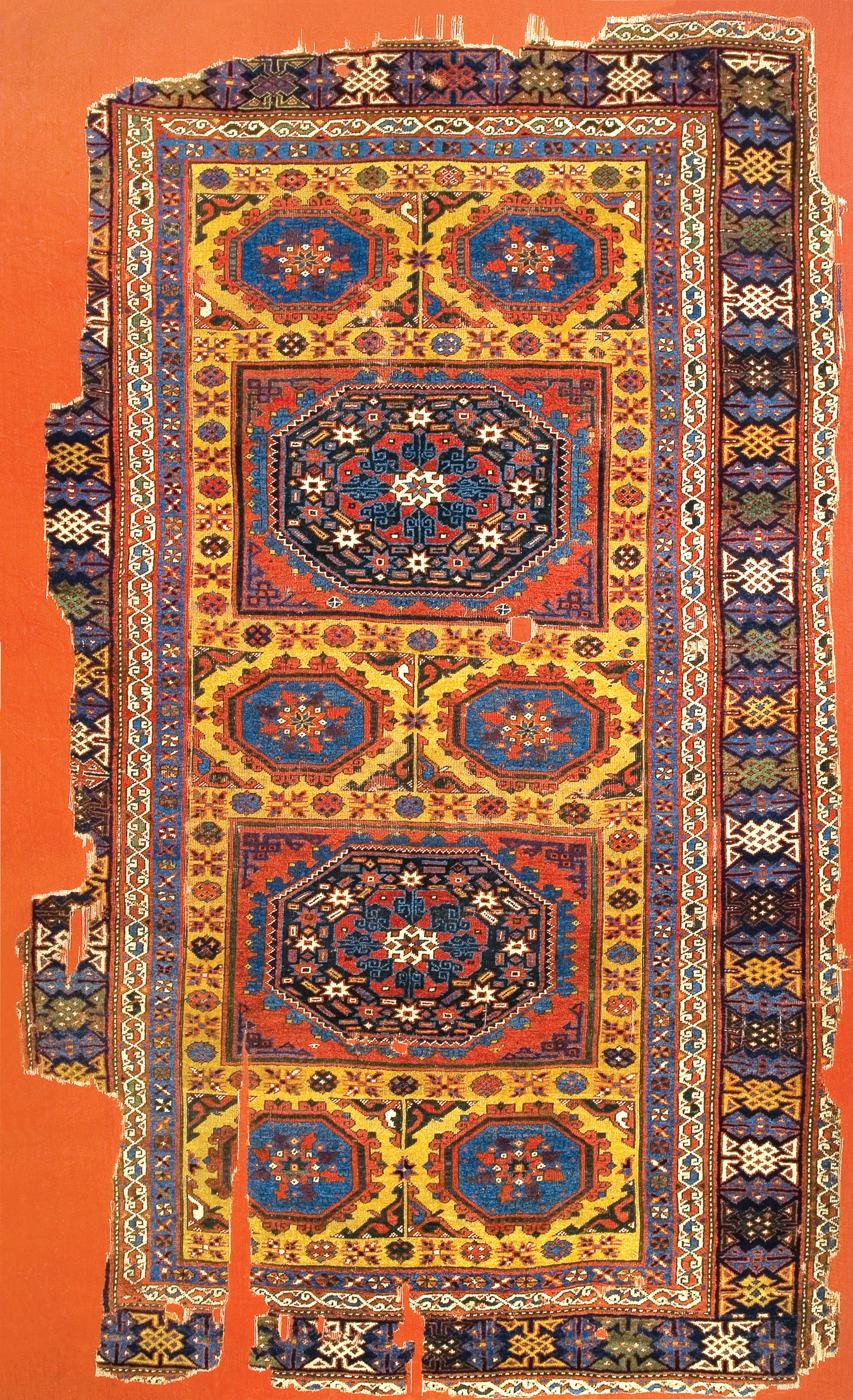
Type IV large-pattern Holbein carpet, 16th century, Bergama region. Turkish and Islamic Arts Museum

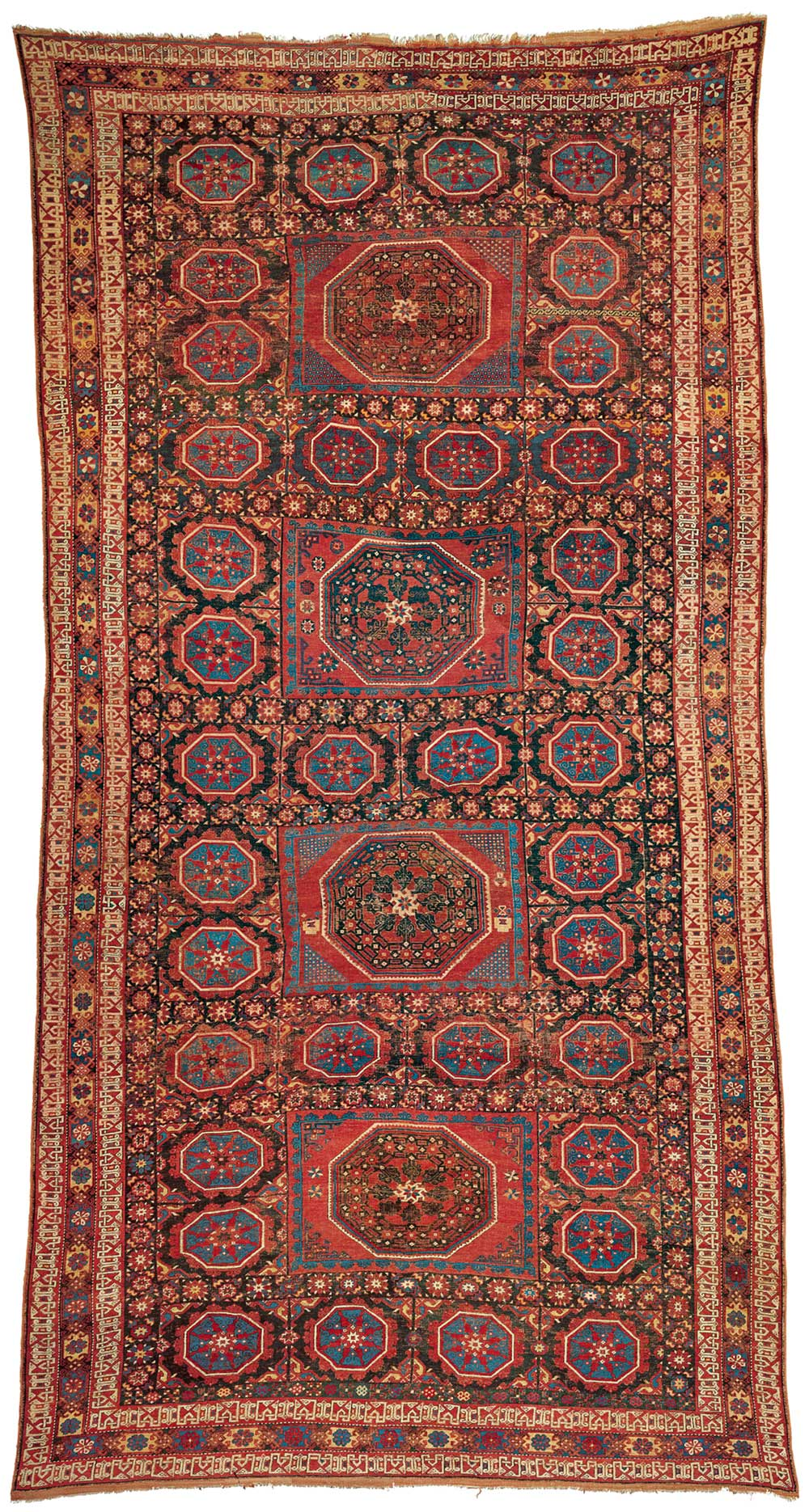
Large-pattern Holbein carpet, C-14 dated to 1370–1450 AD (95.4% probability)

Holbein carpets are a type of Ottoman carpet taking their name from Hans Holbein the Younger, due to their depiction in European Renaissance paintings, although they are shown in paintings from many decades earlier than Holbein. The art historian Kurt Erdmann has sub-divided the "Holbein" design into four types (of which Holbein actually only painted two); they are among the commonest designs of Anatolian carpet seen in Western Renaissance paintings. Their production started by the mid-15th century, and continued to be produced for nearly two centuries. All are purely geometric and use a variety of arrangements of lozenges, crosses and octagonal motifs within the main field. The sub-divisions are between:

- Type I: Small-pattern Holbein. This type is defined by an infinite repeat of small patterns, with alternating rows of octagons and staggered rows of diamonds, as seen in Holbein the Younger's Portrait of Georg Gisze (1532), or the Somerset House Conference (1608).
- Type II: now more often called Lotto carpets.
- Type III: Large-pattern Holbein. The motifs in the field inside the border consist of one or two large squares filled with octagons, placed regularly, and separated from each other and from the borders by narrow stripes. There are no secondary "gul (in armenian "vard", i.e. "rose")" motifs. The carpet in Holbein's The Ambassadors is of this type.
- Type IV: Large-pattern Holbein. Large, square, star-filled compartments are combined with secondary, smaller squares containing octagons or other "gul" motifs. In contrast to the other types, which only contain patterns of equal scale, the type IV Holbein shows subordinate ornaments of unequal scale.

Holbein frequently used carpets in portraits, on tables for most sitters, but on the floor for Henry VIII.

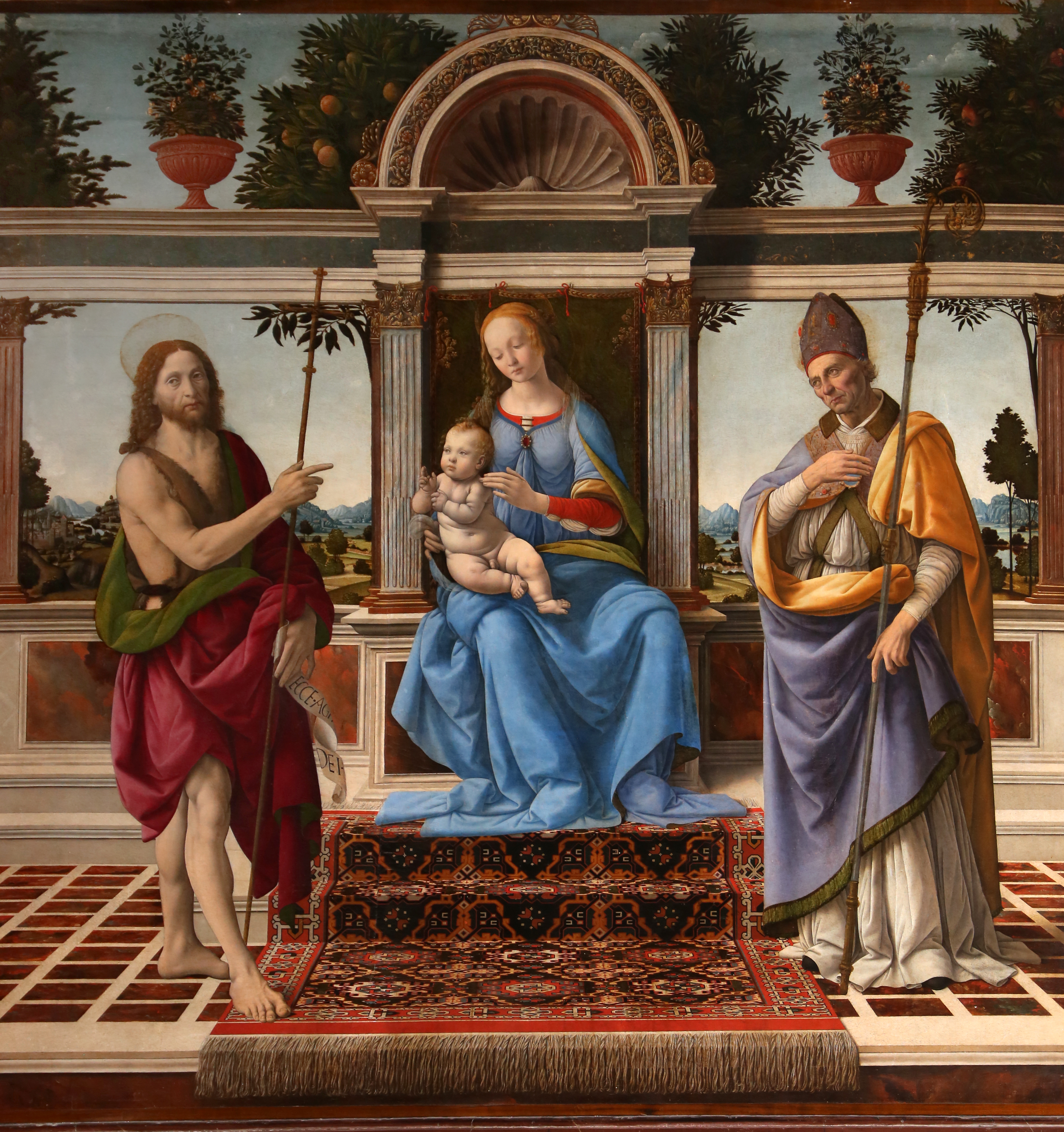
Verrocchio's Madonna with Saint John the Baptist and Donatus 1475-1483.

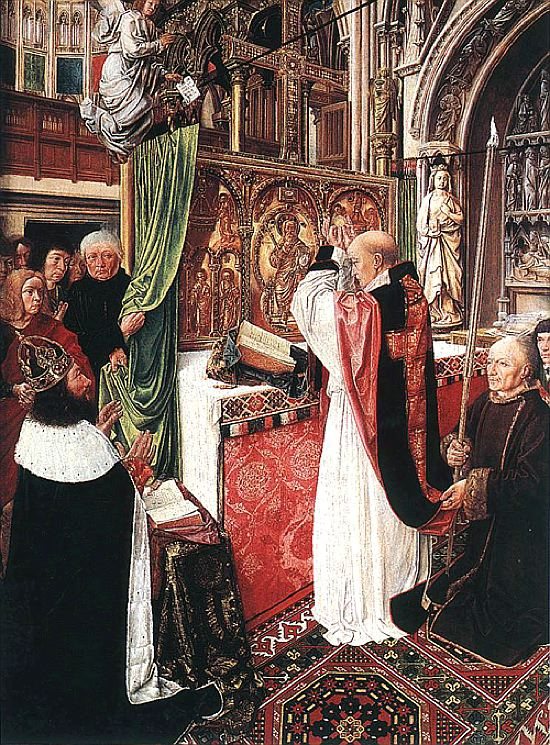
Master of Saint Giles, Mass of Saint Giles, c. 1500, with a Type III Holbein carpet.

French ambassador to England Jean de Dinteville in "The Ambassadors", by Hans Holbein the Younger, 1533. This is a "large-pattern Holbein", Type III.

== See also ==
- Ushak carpet
- Oriental carpets in Renaissance painting
