= Tovarishch (disambiguation) =

Tovarishch (Russian: товарищ) is a Russian word meaning comrade, friend, colleague, or ally.

Tovarishch, tovarisch, tovarish, or tovarich may also refer to:

== Arts and entertainment ==
- Tovaritch (1933 play), a 1933 play in French by Jacques Deval
  - Tovaritch (film), a 1935 French film based on the 1933 play
  - Tovarich (1935 play), a 1935 play in English by Robert E. Sherwood based on Deval's 1933 play
    - Tovarich (film), a 1937 American film based on the Sherwood play
    - Tovarich (musical), a 1963 musical based on the 1935 play
- Tovarich, a comic strip by Antonio Prohías
- Tovarishch (band), a Soviet Ukrainian band

== Other uses ==
- 2787 Tovarishch, a minor planet
- Gorch Fock (1933), a German three-mast barque used by the USSR under the name Tovarishch
- Tovarishch (newspaper) (1906–1908), a daily paper published in St. Petersburg, Russia

== See also ==
- Towarzysz, cavalry soldiers in the Polish army since the 16th century
