= Yarn (Ukrainian musical group) =

Ukrainian musical group

Yarn (Ярн) was a Ukrainian music group from Kyiv, Ukraine. As with many groups of the 90s "Novaya Scena", Yarn took influence from local folk traditions and medieval music.

The original composition of Yarn consisted of Ivan Moskalenko, Oleksandr Yurchenko, Olha "Ptiza" Horynina, Leonid Beley and Vitaliy Garanzha. Horynina, the original vocalist, retired after two albums and was replaced by Serhiy "Foma" Fomenko.

A sister project of the group named Kvitchala v Serpni (Квiтчала в Серпнi) held the same core membership, but with the vocalist Oleksandra Mailliet. In addition, they had a one time collaboration with vocalist Inga Blazhchuk.

The group's alumni went on to be influential within the musical culture of Ukraine. Yurchenko collaborated with Svitlana Nianio in addition to his independent work as a composer and illustrator, Horynina became a radio host, Moskalenko became a music producer under the name of DJ Derbastler and Fomenko and Beley formed the band Mandry.

Yarn's music was featured on prominent Ukrainian music compilations Skhovaysya (Сховайся) and Between Rains and Drought (Між Дощами та Засухою).
