= Samael (disambiguation) =

Samael is an archangel in Talmudic and post-Talmudic lore.

Samael may also refer to:

- Samael (band), a Swiss symphonic black/industrial metal band
- Samael Aun Weor (1917–1977), Colombian occult writer
- Lucifer (DC Comics) (Lucifer Samael Morningstar), a DC Comics character
- Sammael (The Wheel of Time), a fictional character in the novel series Wheel of Time
- Samael, a fictional character in the video game Discworld Noir
- Sammael, a fictional character in the film Hellboy

== See also ==
- Samiel (disambiguation)
