= Huis ten Bosch (disambiguation) =

Huis ten Bosch is a royal palace in The Hague, the home of King Willem-Alexander of the Netherlands.

Huis ten Bosch or Huis Ten Bosch may also refer to:

- Huis Ten Bosch (theme park), a Dutch theme park in Nagasaki, Japan
- Huis Ten Bosch (train), the train service between Fukuoka and the Huis Ten Bosch theme park
- Huis Ten Bosch Station

== See also ==
- Bosch (disambiguation)
