= Boce =

Boce may refer to:

== Geography ==
- Boće, a village in Bosnia and Herzegovina
- Boće (Raška), a village in Serbia
- Bocé, former commune in the Maine-et-Loire department in western France

== People ==
- Elmaz Boçe (1852–1925) Albanian educator

== Animals ==
- Boce, a common name for Boops boops

== Other ==
- Boces (disambiguation)
