= Rabbota Ho =

Ukrainian musical group

Rabbota Ho (Раббота Хо) was an experimental rock band formed in Kyiv, Ukraine. They are considered one of the most influential Ukrainian musical groups of its era along with Kollezhskiy Asessor. They were an integral part of the Kyiv music scene named "rok-artil".

== Background ==
The group was formed in Soviet Ukraine and produced music with an erratic, experimental post-punk sound that often used dissonance between upbeat songs and dark lyrics. They achieved notability throughout the Soviet Union, distributing their records through samizdat. Their 1989 album Repetitsiya bez orkestra (Репетиция без Оркестра) was later listed in on Alexander Kushnir's 100 Tapes of Soviet Rock.

Tracks from this group were included in the Novaya Scena: Underground From Ukraine! compilation.
