= Cukor Bila Smerť =

Ukrainian avant-garde musical group

Cukor Bila Smerť Цукор — біла смерть
- Origin: Kyiv, Ukraine
- Genres: Dark wave; Ukrainian folk; avant-prog
- Years active: 1988–1993
- Labels: Koka Records
- Members: Svitlana Nianio; Tamila Mazur; Jevhen Taran; Oleksandr Kochanovskyj

Cukor Bila Smerť (Ukrainian: Цукор — біла смерть [ˈtsukor ˈbilɐ ˈsmɛrtʲ], lit. 'Sugar — White Death') was a Ukrainian dark wave band formed in Kyiv, Ukraine. The band was active from 1988, until its dissolution in 1993. It was one of the first bands that initiated the creation of the Novaya Scena ("new scene") in Ukraine, which was also called the "ethno-gothic" scene for its style drawing on dark wave. They are considered to be one of the most prominent musical projects of the Ukrainian underground, drawing in a Western online cult following in the 2010s and onwards.

== History ==
After Svitlana Nianio had graduated from music school with a degree in piano, she began composing music. At first, she played with cellist Tamila Mazur. In 1988, they formed Cukor Bila Smerť ("Sugar - White Death") with guitarist Jevhen Taran and pianist Oleksandr Kochanovskyj. The band is particularly notable for their use of high-pitched female vocals, non-sensical lyrics, and instrumental-gothic performance, which significantly differed from the Ukrainian music of their time.

In the same year as their formation, they released their debut album, Rododendrony Karalovi Aspydy. A year after, in 1989, two more albums were released: a compilation Novye Nezhenki and a studio album Lilei I Amarillisy.

In 1991, in collaboration with Ukrainian musician Ivan Samshyt, a more industrial-sounding album called Samshit Ne Sahar was released.

At that time, alternative bands were not able to make professional recordings in Ukraine and like other well-known Ukrainian bands, they recorded on the Polish label Koka Records. Two albums are available on this label: Manirna Muzyka (1991) and Selo (1993).

According to another prominent Ukrainian underground musician, Ihor Cymbrovskyj, who also recorded for Koka Records, the band has fans in Poland, where there are more listeners of such music than in Ukraine; in particular, Polish experimental band Księżyc have repeatedly stated that they were inspired by the works of Svitlana Nianio.

The collective disbanded in 1993, after which, former members continued to release solo records. The Ukrainian label Shukai released a digitally remastered compilation of selections from their discography, Recordings 1990—1993, in 2024.

== Discography ==
=== Studio Albums ===
- Rododendrony Karalovi Aspydy (1988)
- Lilei I Amarillisy (1989)
- Manirna Muzyka (1991)
- Selo (1993)

=== Collaborations ===
- Samshit Ne Sahar (with Ivan Samshyt; 1991)

=== Compilations ===
- Novye Nezhenki (1989)
- Recordings 1990—1993 (2024)

== Sources ==
- Цукор тільки на експорт // «Moloda Hvardija» (Kyiv). 15 May 1991. (№ 134).
- Oleksander Jevtushenko. Колізей чекає! // «Moloda Hvardija» (Kyiv). — 3 October 1990. (№117).
