= Koka Records =

Polish record label

Koka Records is a Polish record label for traditional Ukrainian folk music and Ukrainian independent music founded in 1989. They have published albums by groups such as Kazma-Kazma, Cukor Bila Smerť, Kollezhskiy Asessor The Ukrainians, Drevo and Oseledets' as well as individuals like Svitlana Nianio, Ihor Tsymbrovsky and Mykhailo Hai. They are considered to be an important part of Ukraine's underground music history.

The label was founded by the Ukrainian musician Volodymyr Nakonetchny (Polish: Włodzimierz Nakonieczny) in 1989. As the state monopoly on music recording and release had already ended in Poland, Poland became a viable place to release underground recordings made in Soviet Ukraine. As the years went on and the Soviet Union ceased to exist, Koka's scope expanded to include traditional music, with special focus on the music around the Polish-Ukrainian border. The majority of bands released on KOKA were recorded in the private studio of composer Tadeusz Sudnik, who called it Studio of Impossible Sounds.
