= Tovarishch (band) =

Soviet Ukrainian musical group

Tovarishch (Ukrainian: Товарищ, romanized: Tovaryshch) was a Soviet Ukrainian experimental rock band from Kharkiv that centered around mathematician Alexander "Sasha" Panchenko. The group was influential within the musical subculture of Kharkiv at the time. Several groups spawned from alumni, such as Kazma-Kazma and Elza.

== Background ==
Panchenko, a math expert with an interest in ethnomusicology, founded the group during perestroika. His interest in Kazakh and Turkmen music influenced Tovarisch's folk-punk like sound. Panchenko and Serhii Myasoyedov created the musical union "Novaya Scena" to fuel the growing underground culture of Kharkiv - the name "novaya scena" went on to be used as a label for the Ukrainian underground culture as a whole in this period among westerners. The group ended when Panchenko moved to the United States to become an academic researcher.

Tovarishch produced one album, Chto ugodno, kak ugodno (Что угодно, как угодно). This album was later listed in Alexander Kushnir's 100 Tapes of Soviet Rock.
