= Kazma-Kazma =

Ukrainian avant-garde musical group

- Origin: Kharkiv, Kharkiv, Ukraine
- Genres: Art rock; experimental rock; psychedelic rock; experimental folk; avant-garde; neoclassical music; neo-medieval folk; experimental; minimalisn
- Years active: 1991–1994
- Labels: Koka
- Past members: Evgen Hodosh; Dmitry Kurovsky; Eugene Nikolayevsky; Alexander Negoduyko; Valery Kharkovsky; Vitaliy Shevchuk; Eugene Baryshnikov

Kazma-Kazma (Казма-Казма) was a Soviet Ukrainian avant-garde musical group formed in Kharkiv in 1991 by Yevhen Khodosh. Khodosh created the group following the end of another influential Kharkiv group named Tovarishch.

Considered the most prominent group of the Kharkiv independent scene in its day, alumni from this musical group became influential within Ukrainian music; flautist Dmytro Kurovskiy went on to found long running Ukrainian band Foa-Hoka (uk:Фоа-Хока) while bassoonist Oleh Mykhailyuta became a member of TNMK. Kazma-Kazma was a major player in the Kharkiv music union "Novaya Scena"; the name "Novaya Scena" later became associated with the experimental underground music of Ukraine among western audiences.

Their debut album Plyaski trubadurov was listed in Alexander Kushnir's 100 Tapes of Soviet Rock. On this album, Kazma-Kazma combined medieval music with post-punk and avant-prog.

After Ukraine gained independence later that year, Kazma-Kazma released two more albums. The first, Katakomby lyubvi, was an independent release on Khodosh's label "Paradise Delight of Bianca", which also released the compilation Skhovaysya. The second was Komediya Antona on Koka Records. These albums had less experimental rock influence. Their second album took a more orthodox medieval approach, while their final album played minimalist music in a medieval style. The group disbanded in 1994. None of their albums have been reissued as of 2022.
