= Oleksandr Yurchenko =

Ukrainian avant-garde musician (1966–2020)

Oleksandr Yurchenko (Ukrainian: Олександр Юрченко; May 27, 1966 – April 27, 2020) was a Ukrainian avant-garde musician, illustrator and instrument creator.

Yurchenko was closely tied to the 1990s Ukrainian underground called "Novaya Scena." He played in several groups, including Yarn (where Serhiy Fomenko of Mandry sung for a time), Merta Zara, Elektryky, Kvitchala v Serpni, Radiodello, Suphina Dentata, Suphina's Little Beasts and Blemish. He was known for using instruments of his own invention; some of these instruments appear on his collaborations with Svitlana Nianio like Znayesh yak? Rozkazhy.

Yurchenko became ill after a stroke. His health continued to decline afterwards, causing him to give up music in favor of illustrating. In early 2020, the Ukrainian label Delta Shock released a previously unreleased composition of Yurchenko's from 1994 called Lichy do sta: Symphony №1 to help fund his treatments near the end of his life. He died on April 27 of that year; further proceeds from Lichy do sta went to his widow.
