= Samiel =

Samiel may refer to:

- Simoom, a strong, dry, dust-laden wind
- Samael, an archangel in Talmudic and post-Talmudic lore
- Samiel, a fictional character in the opera Der Freischütz

== See also ==
- Samael (disambiguation)
