= Bosh =

Bosh or BOSH may refer to:

- BOSH (protocol), a transport protocol in computer networking
- Bosh (band), a Christian rock band from Bournemouth, United Kingdom
- Bosh (rapper), French rapper
- BOSH (software), a project for release engineering, deployment, and lifecycle management
- BOSH!, a vegan cookery duo
- John Fisher (social media personality), known for his catchphrase "Bosh"
- The bosh, the portion of a blast furnace above the tuyeres and below the stack, where ore turns molten.

== People with the name ==
- Chris Bosh, American professional basketball player
- Chris Bosh (wrestler), American professional wrestler
- Bosh Pritchard (1919–1996), American football player

== See also ==
- Bausch & Lomb
- Boche (disambiguation)
- Bosc (disambiguation)
- Bosch (disambiguation)
- Bosh Berlin, an American rock band from St. Louis
- Boshe
