= Roman Bausch =

German politician (born 1982)

Member of the Landtag of Hesse
- Incumbent
- Assumed office 18 January 2024

Personal details
- Born: 22 July 1982 (age 44)
- Party: Alternative for Germany (since 2016)

Roman Bausch (born 22 July 1982) is a German politician serving as a member of the Landtag of Hesse since 2024. He has served as treasurer of the Alternative for Germany in Hesse since 2025.
