= Kollezhskiy Asessor =

Ukrainian musical group

Kollezhskiy Asessor (Коллежский асессор) was an experimental rock group from Kyiv, Ukraine formed by composer Vasiliy Goydenko. The group began in Soviet times, but continued into Ukrainian independence. The group was unstable and was prone to collapsing and regrouping, inhibiting their ability to spread in popularity beyond Ukraine and Russia.

Considered one of the most influential Ukrainian groups in its prime along with Rabbota Ho, Kollezhskiy Asessor produced several albums during the late 80s through the 90s. Their album Koll. As. (Колл. Ас.) was listed on Alexander Kushnir's 100 Tapes of Soviet Rock. Their final major album, Sex Bomben Auf Engelland, released in 2001.

Their records were distributed by Koka Records in Poland and Tatyana Yezhova's samizdat label Guchnomovets.
