= Busch, Missouri =

Unincorporated community in Missouri, United States

Coordinates: 39°34′47″N 91°11′34″W

Busch is an extinct town in Pike County, in the U.S. state of Missouri. The GNIS classifies it as a populated place.

A post office called Busch was in operation from 1886 to 1948. The community took its name from the Anheuser-Busch company, which kept an ice warehouse near the site.
