= Cathryn Boch =

French artist

Cathryn Boch (born 1968, Strasbourg), is a French award-winning artist who lives and works in Marseille. She won Drawing Now Prize in 2014. She obtained many residencies abroad and exhibited at key galleries and museums, including MAMCO Geneva in 2009.

== Life ==
=== Education ===
Cathryn Boch was born in Strasbourg in 1968. She graduated from University of Strasbourg in 1990, receiving General Academic Studies Degree (D.E.U.G.) in History of Art. Later she received National Diploma of Plastic Art Studies (1994) and National Superior Diploma of Plastic Expression (1996) from Graduate School of Decorative Arts of Strasbourg. In 2002-2003 Boch also completed Visual Art training (C.F.P.I) at Graduate School of Decorative Arts of Strasbourg.

=== Awards and recognition ===
In 2014 she won Drawing Now Prize. Between 1995 and 2001 Boch was one of four artists known as the group “Les Pisseuses” who chalked exquisite corpses on the walls of Strasbourg.

== Art ==
Boch uses road maps, aerial views, topographic surveys and entire iconography of locating, measing and recording the territory as a raw material for her artworks. As a painter she mixes the colors on her palette to get the desired tone, like a sculptor she takes pieces of the material to give the substance a form. She calls the job she is doing “drawing”: she works with the paper, touching it, sanding, scraping and piercing, until the drawing is revealed in layers. Manipulating maps with hand sewing, she creates sculptural topography. The tension of the threads hardens the folds and paper turns into sculpture, reinforced with a frosting of sugar or varnish. Tension of the material is used as a metaphor of world's tension shaken by migratory crisis, rise of extremes, wars and global warming. For Boch, born in Alsace border region of parents from both countries, geographical borders in her works is a paradoxical space, both marginal and central, a space of closure and encounter.

Boch's work was featured in numerous exhibitions at key galleries and museums, including the Galerie Christian Berst, Paris and the Galerie Sébastien Bertrand, Rue de l'Evêché among others. Her works are in public collections of Frac Picardie and PACA, Municipal Fund of the City of Paris (FMAC) and the Georges Pompidou Center, as well as in several renowned private collections.

== Exhibitions ==
=== Solo exhibitions ===
- 2019 - Reverse, Galerie Papillon, Paris
- 2016 - Monads, Galerie Papillon, Paris
- 2015 - N 48 ° 51 '47' 'E 2 ° 21'24' ', The Observatory, BHV Marais, Paris
- 2015 - N 43 ° 18 '21.5' 'E 5 ° 22'03.0' ', Experimental Tray, FRAC Paca, Marseille
- 2014 - Saint Germain des Prés course, La Perla, Paris
- 2014 - Cathryn Boch, Sébastien Bertrand Gallery, Geneva, Switzerland
- 2013 - N ° 48 ° 51 '47' 'E 2 ° 21'24' ', Claudine Papillon Gallery, Paris
- 2012 - Shameless Modesty, Galerie Sébastien Bertrand, Geneva, Switzerland
- 2010 - Ent 10 12 9 lassen, Anne de Villepoix Gallery, Paris
- 2009 - 10 8 6 überholen, Commissioner Christian Bernard in the context of the cycle "The kind of thing melancholy ", MAMCO, Geneva, Switzerland
- 2008 - Oriented drawing, Galerie Anne de Villepoix, Paris
- 2007 - With each step one stumbles ..., Center of Art of CEAAC, Strasbourg
- 2006 - Project room "Drawings", Galerie Anne de Villepoix, Paris
- 2006 - Basanaviviaus j-3, French Embassy, Vilnius, Lithuania

=== Group exhibitions (selected) ===
- 2019 - Mare Nostrum. Mediterranean Identities, Villa Datris, Espace Monte Cristo, Paris
- 2019 - Memories of travel. The collection of Antoine de Galbert, Grenoble Museum, Grenoble
- 2018 - Soft Power, Pallet Truck, Bourges
- 2017 - Paratissima13, Caserma La Marmora, Turin, Italy
- 2017 - Inextricabilia, magic entanglements, La Maison Rouge, Paris
- 2016 - Between the lines, Art Zone, Strasbourg
- 2016 - The drawn contemporary, Museum of Decorative Arts, Paris
- 2015 - Either 10 years, Interior States, Galerie Christian Berst, Paris
- 2015 - Works on paper, Sébastien Bertrand Gallery, Geneva, Switzerland
- 2015 - Feel Paris, Lelege Art Gallery, Beijing, China
- 2014 - Choices, Palace of Fine Arts, Paris
- 2013 - Drawings - Faux drawings, Galerie Papillon, Paris
- 2013 - Donation Daniel and Florence Guerlain Foundation, Center Pompidou, Paris
- 2011 - Recent Acquisitions of the Cabinet d'Art Graphique, Center Pompidou, Paris
- 2010 - Elles@centrepompidou, Artists women in the collections of the Center Pompidou, Center Pompidou, Paris
- 2008 - Subtil Textile, Galleries Gallery, Galeries Lafayette Paris
- 2001 - 1 + 1 + 1 + 1 ++ 1 ... Picnic, Museum of Modern Art of Sintra, Portugal
- 2000 - Prime Time. "1 + 1 + 1 + 1 ..., Commissioner Pascal Neveux, FRAC Alsace, Sélestat

== Collections ==
- Municipal Fund of the City of Paris (FMAC), Paris
- Picardie Regional Contemporary Art Fund (FRAC Picardie), Amiens
- Regional Contemporary Art Fund PACA (FRAC PACA), Marseille
- Daniel and Florence Guerlain Foundation, Paris
- Modern and Contemporary Art Museum (MAMCO Geneva), Geneva
- National Fund of Contemporary Art, Paris
- Cabinet of Graphic Art, Georges Pompidou Center, Paris
- Antoine de Galbert Collection, The Red House, Paris
