= Bausch =

Bausch is a German surname. Notable people with the surname include:

- Andy Bausch (born 1959), Luxembourgish cinematographer and director
- Dotsie Bausch (born 1973), American cyclist
- François Bausch (born 1956), Luxembourgish politician, member of the Chamber of Deputies
- Frank Bausch (1908–1976), American professional football player
- James Bausch (a.k.a. Jarring Jim) (1906–1974), American Olympic decathlete
- John Jacob Bausch (1830–1926), German-American optician who co-founded Bausch & Lomb
- Paul Bausch (1895–1981), German politician
- Pina Bausch (1940–2009), German modern-dance choreographer
- Richard Bausch (born 1945), American author
- Robert Bausch (1945–2018), American author and professor of English
- Roman Bausch (born 1982), German politician

== See also ==
- Bausch Health, a pharmaceutical company
- Bausch & Lomb, an American manufacturer of contact lenses and eye-care products
