= Borș =

Borş can refer to:

- Borș (bran), an ingredient in Romanian cuisine used to make sour soup
- Borș, Bihor (Hungarian: Bors), a commune in Bihor County, Romania
- Valentin Borș (born 1983), Romanian football player
