= Svitlana Nianio =

Ukrainian singer and songwriter

Svitlana Nianio (Ukrainian: Світлана Няньо [s⁽ʲ⁾witˈlɑnɐ ˈnʲɑnʲo]) is a Ukrainian avant-garde singer-songwriter. She was previously a member of the Kyiv experimental group Cukor Bila Smerť (lit. Sugar White Death). In addition, she produced albums with experimental musician Oleksandr Yurchenko. During the early 1990s she was known as Svitlana Ohrimenko (Світлана Охріменко).

== Biography ==
Little is known about Svitlana Nianio's background. In an interview with RWCDAX, she states that her parents were Catholic and that she grew up with an interest in religious and traditional music. She went on to attend a music conservatory in Kyiv, where she formed Cukor Bila Smertʹ in 1988 with Eugene Taran, Oleksandr Kochanovsky, and Tamila Mazur. The group disbanded in 1993.

Following the end of Cukor Bila Smertʹ, she worked on music independently. Notably, she produced two albums with Oleksandr Yuchenko. In 1999 she released her first solo credited album Kytytsi on Koka Records. She struggled to find concerts after the "Music The World Does Not See" concert series in 2000, leading to her disappearance from the public eye.

Nianio's music saw a major international resurgence in interest during the 2010s, leading to the reissue of some of her albums and a return to public performing beginning in 2017, including a livestream during the COVID-19 pandemic.
