= Bos (surname) =

Bos is a Dutch surname. Meaning "woods" or "forest", the name often is topographic. In 2007, 35,405 people carried the name in the Netherlands, making it the 14th most common surname there.

Notable people named Bos include:

- Abraham Bos (born 1943), Dutch historian and philosopher
- Annie Bos (1886–1975), Dutch theater and silent film actress
- Bert Bos (born 1963), Dutch computer scientist
- Burny Bos (1944–2023), Dutch producer, scenarist and children's book writer
- Caroline Bos (born 1959), Dutch architect
- Coenraad V. Bos (1875–1955), Dutch classical pianist
- Cornelis Bos (c.1508–1555), Flemish engraver, printseller and book publisher
- Cyril Bos (born 1972), French racing cyclist
- Dianne Bos (born 1956), Canadian photographer
- Ery Bos (1908–2005), Dutch-German dancer and film actress, daughter of Coenraad V. Bos
- Frederik Bos (1866–1931), Dutch farmer and politician
- Gijsbert Bos (born 1973), Dutch football forward
- Hans Bos (born 1950), Dutch biochemist
- Henk Bos (footballer) (born 1992), Dutch football midfielder
- Henk Bos (painter) (1901–1979), Dutch painter
- Henk J. M. Bos (1940–2024), Dutch historian of mathematics
- Iwona Bos-Swiecik (born 1958), Polish-Dutch chess master
- Jaap Bos (born 1953), Dutch footballer
- Jan Bos (born 1975), Dutch speed skater & cyclist, brother of cyclist Theo Bos
- Jan-Just Bos (1939–2003), Dutch botanist, television presenter and rower
- Jan Ritzema Bos (1850–1928), Dutch phytopathologist, brother of Pieter Roelof
- Jane Bos (1897–1975), pseudonym of French film score composer Jane Malka
- Johnny Bos (1952–2013), American boxer and writer
- Kimberley Bos (born 1993), Dutch skeleton racer
- Kirsten Bos (born c. 1980), Canadian physical anthropologist
- Lambert Bos (1670–1717), Dutch scholar and critic
- Lex Bos (born 1957), Dutch field hockey goalkeeper
- Loek Bos (born 1946), Dutch cartoonist, painter and sculptor
- Marcelien Bos-de Koning (born 1978), Dutch competitive sailor
- Marco Bos (born 1979), Dutch racing cyclist
- Mark Bos (born 1960), Australian-rules footballer
- Mirjam Bos (born 1989), Dutch human rights activist
- Nel Bos (born 1947), Dutch swimmer
- Peter Bos (born 1950), Dutch actor
- Peter Bos (rower) (born 1938), American rower
- Pieter Roelof Bos (1847–1902), Dutch teacher and atlas publisher, brother of Jan Ritzema
- Renée Jones-Bos (born 1952), Dutch diplomat, Netherlands Ambassasor to Russia
- Roel Bos (born 1942), Dutch movie actor with the stage name Glenn Saxson
- Saskia Bos (born 1970), Dutch museum curator and art historian
- Stef Bos (born 1961), Dutch pop singer active in South Africa
- Tamara Bos (born 1967), Dutch screenwriter
- Theo Bos (born 1983), Dutch road and track cyclist, brother of speed skater Jan Bos
- Theo Bos (footballer) (1965–2013), Dutch footballer and manager
- Thomas Bos (born 1968), Dutch speed skater
- Willemijn Bos (born 1988), Dutch field hockey player
- Wouter Bos (born 1963), Dutch politician, leader of the Labour Party, PvdA

== Fictional characters ==
- Dick Bos, protagonist of the Dutch detective comics series by the same name

== See also ==
- Boesch, Bos, Bosc, Bösch, Bosch, Busch, Busche, Bush, Busk, ten Bos, Van den Bos, Van den Bosch, Van den Bossche, Von dem Busche
