= Bush (surname) =

The surname Bush is derived from either the Old English word "busc" or the Old Norse "buskr," both of which mean "bush," a shrub, and was probably used for someone who lived in a bushy area.

Variations of the surname "Bush" include: Bushe, Bosch, Boush, Boushe, Busch, Bussche, Buscher, Bysh, and Bysshe.

The Bush family has held a family seat in Yorkshire, northern England.

== People with the Bush name ==
=== Members of the United States political Bush family ===
- Obadiah Newcomb Bush (1797–1851), father of
  - James Smith Bush (1825–1889), father of
    - Samuel P. Bush (1863–1948), father of
      - Prescott Bush (1895–1972), senator and financier
        - George H. W. Bush (1924–2018), 41st President of the United States, First Lady Barbara Bush (1925–2018)
          - George W. Bush (born 1946), 43rd President of the United States, First Lady Laura Bush (born 1946)
            - Barbara Bush (born 1981)
            - Jenna Bush Hager (born 1981), TV reporter
          - Jeb Bush (born 1953), Governor of Florida 1999–2007, married to Columba Bush (born 1953)
            - George P. Bush (born 1976), real estate developer and investor, Commissioner of the Texas General Land Office
            - Noelle Lucila Bush (born 1977)
            - John Ellis "Jebby" Bush Jr. (born 1983)
          - Neil Bush (born 1955), businessman, former banker
            - Lauren Bush (born 1984), fashion model and designer
            - Pierce Bush
          - Marvin Bush (born 1956), financier
          - Dorothy Bush Koch (born 1959)
        - Jonathan Bush (1931–2021), banker and political fundraiser and his son:
          - Billy Bush (born 1971), radio and television host
        - William H. T. Bush (1938–2018), banker and venture capitalist

=== Other people ===
- Alan Bush (1900–1995), English classical composer and pianist
- A. S. Bush (1837–1917), American politician
- Archie Bush (umpire), American professional baseball umpire
- Bryan Bush (1925–2008), English footballer
- Carol Bush (born 1962), county judge of Ellis County, Texas
- Charles P. Bush (1809–1857), American politician from Michigan
- Chris Bush (disambiguation), multiple people
- Connie Bush (1919–1997), Australian aboriginal health worker
- Cori Bush (born 1976), American politician from Missouri
- Curtis Bush (born 1962), American kickboxer
- Darren Bush (born 1974), American baseball coach
- Dave Bush (born 1979), Major League Baseball pitcher
- Devin Bush Jr. (born 1998), American football player
- Donie Bush (1887–1972), baseball player and manager of the early 20th century
- Duncan Bush (1946–2017), Welsh poet, novelist and dramatist
- Edith Bush (1882–1977), American mathematician, sister of Vannevar
- Ethel Bush (1916–2016), British police officer awarded a George Medal
- Garnet Bush (1882–1919), baseball umpire
- Geoffrey Bush (1920–1998), English composer
- George Bush (disambiguation)
- George Washington Bush (1779–1863), black pioneer settler of the Pacific Northwest, Oregon & Washington
- Grand L. Bush (born 1955), American actor
- Gregg Bush, American politician
- Guy Louis Bush (1929 – 2023), American evolutionary biologist
- Guy Terrell Bush (1901 – 1985), American baseball player
- Irving T. Bush (1869–1948), American businessman
- James Bush (1907 – 1987), American actor
- Lt James Bush M.C. (1891–1917), World War I flying ace
- Jason Eugene "Gunny" Bush (born 1974), convicted to death for the murders of Raul and Brisenia Flores
- Jess Bush, (born 1992), Australian actress and artist
- Joe Bush (disambiguation), multiple people
- John Bush (disambiguation), several people
- Kate Bush (born 1958), English musician
- Ky Bush (born 1999), American baseball player
- Leland Bush (born c. 1951), judge of the District Court of Minnesota
- Lesley Bush (born 1947), Olympic diver
- Luis Bush, American Christian strategist-activist
- Lynn J. Bush (born 1948), judge of the United States Court of Federal Claims
- Marian Spore Bush (1878–1946), American artist and dentist
- Mary Bucci Bush (born 1949), American novelist
- Matt Bush (disambiguation), multiple people
- Michael Bush (born 1984), American football running back
- Norton Bush (1834–1894), American landscape painter
- Percy Bush (1879–1955), Welsh rugby union player
- Reggie Bush (born 1985), American football player
- Robert Bush (disambiguation), several people
- Roger Bush (disambiguation), several people
- Sam Bush (born 1952), American musician
- Sarah Bush Lincoln (1788–1869), stepmother of Abraham Lincoln
- Sophia Bush (born 1982), American actress
- Stan Bush (born 1953), American singer
- Stephen Bush (disambiguation), several people
- Sydney Bush (1929–2018), British optometrist
- Tamara Bush, American biomechanical engineer
- Thomas Bush (disambiguation), several people
- Tommy Bush (1928–2003), American actor
- Vannevar Bush (1890–1974), American scientist, brother of Edith
- Wesley G. Bush (born c. 1961), American business executive
- William Bush (disambiguation), multiple people
- Zhan Bush (born 1993), Russian figure skater
- Zoe Bush (born 1954), senior judge of the Superior Court of the District of Columbia

== Fictional characters ==
- Mel Bush, companion of the Doctor in the television series Doctor Who
- William Bush, a Royal Navy Lieutenant in the book and television series Hornblower

== See also ==
- Boesch, Bösch, Bosch, Busch, Busche, Bush, Busk, Van den Bos, Van den Bosch, Van den Bossche, Von dem Busche
