= Ten Bos =

ten Bos is a Dutch surname, where ten is a tussenvoegsel (family name affix), and the surname literally translates as "at the forest". Notable people with the surname include:

- Eiske ten Bos-Harkema (1885–1962), Dutch politician
- Frans ten Bos, Scotland international rugby union player

== See also ==
- Boesch, Bos, Bosc, Bösch, Bosch, Busch, Busche, Bush, Busk, ten Bos, Van den Bos, Van den Bosch, Van den Bossche, Von dem Busche
