= Bosc =

Bosc may refer to:

- Bosc pear, a cultivar of the European Pear
- Bioinformatics Open Source Conference (BOSC), an academic conference
- Gobiosoma bosc, a fish of family Gobiidae

== People ==
- Louis Augustin Guillaume Bosc (1759–1828), French botanist and zoologist
- Ramon Bosc (fl. 1416), Catalan priest and writer in Latin
- Thomas Bosc (born 1983), French rugby league player
- Jean Bosc (1924 - 1973), French cartoonist

== See also ==
- BOSC23, a human kidney cell line
- Boesch, Bosc, Bösch, Bosch, Busch, Busche, Bush, Busk, Van den Bos, Van den Bosch, Van den Bossche, Von dem Busche
