= Bosch (surname) =

Bosch (Catalan: [ˈbɔsk]; Dutch: [ˈbɔs]) is a popular surname in Catalan and Dutch. In both languages, it is an archaic spelling of a word (modern Catalan bosc, modern Dutch bos) meaning 'forest'.

Notable people with the surname Bosch include:

== In arts, entertainment, and media ==
=== In music ===
- Anabel Bosch (1976–2009), Filipino singer and poet
- Jacques Bosch (1825–1895), Catalan guitarist and song composer
- Jimmy Bosch (b. c. 1960), American jazz and salsa musician
- Leon Bosch (b. 1961), South African double bassist
- Marcus Bosch (b. 1969), German conductor
- Maura Bosch (b. 1958), American composer
- Susana Bosch (b. 1958), Uruguayan vocalist

=== In performing arts ===
- Aurora Bosch (b. 1942), Cuban dancer and ballet teacher
- Fátima Bosch (b. 2000), Mexican model and beauty pageant titleholder
- Francisco Bosch (b. 1982), Spanish actor and dancer
- Joan Bosch (1925–2015), Catalan film director
- Johnny Yong Bosch (b. 1976), American television actor and voice actor
- Jordi Bosch (b. 1956), Catalan actor
- Lydia Bosch (b. 1963), Spanish actress
- Narcis Bosch, Catalan pornographic director
- Roselyne Bosch (b. 1961), French film producer, director and screenwriter

=== Visual artists ===
- Gijs Bosch Reitz (1860–1938), Dutch painter
- Hieronymus Bosch (1450–1516), Dutch painter
- Johannes de Bosch (1713–1785), Dutch painter
- Miguel Jaume y Bosch (1844–1900), Spanish-Uruguayan painter
- Steven Bosch (b. 1978), South African artist

=== Writers ===
- Alfred Bosch (born 1962), Catalan author, politician and historian
- Carles Bosch de la Trinxeria (1831–1897), Catalan writer
- Christine de Bosch Kemper (1840–1924), Dutch writer
- David Bosch (1929–1992), South African missionary and author
- Hieronymus de Bosch (1740–1811), Dutch poet and Latin scholar
- Juan Bosch (1909–2001), Dominican politician and writer
- Pseudonymous Bosch, author of the Secret Series children's books
- Xavier Bosch i Sancho (b. 1967), Catalan writer and journalist

== In business ==
- Anthony Bosch, founder of Biogenesis of America medical clinic
- Felipe A. Bosch Gutierrez (b. 1962), Guatemalan businessman
- George Henry Bosch (1861–1934), Australian merchant and philanthropist
- Henry Bosch (b. 1931), Australian businessman and governance advocate
- José Manuel Lara Bosch (1946–2015), Spanish media executive and businessman
- Joseph Bosch (1850–1937), German-born American brewer
- Juan Luis Bosch Gutiérrez (b. 1952), Guatemalan businessman
- Robert Bosch (1861–1942), German industrialist and inventor, founder of Robert Bosch GmbH
- Robert Bosch Jr. (1928–2004), German billionaire

== In government, politics, and military ==
- Albert H. Bosch (1908–2005), American politician
- Bernardus Bosch (1746–1803), Dutch politician and poet
- Ernesto Bosch (1863–1951), Argentine Foreign Minister and Central Bank official
- Francisco Milans del Bosch (1769–1834), Spanish general
- Hugo von Bosch (1782–1865), Bavarian Lieutenant General and Acting War Minister
- Jaime Milans del Bosch (1915–1997), Spanish general
- Jaume Bosch (b. 1953), Catalan politician
- Jeltje de Bosch Kemper (1836–1916), Dutch feminist
- Jorrit Bosch (born 1997), German politician
- Juan Bosch (1909–2001), Dominican politician and writer
- Lodewijk Hendrik Nicolaas Bosch van Rosenthal (1884–1953), Dutch jurist and politician
- Milagros Ortiz Bosch (b. 1936), Dominican politician
- Orlando Bosch (1926–2011), Cuban exile and terrorist
- Yevgenia Bosch (1879–1925), Ukrainian Bolshevik activist and politician

== In science ==
- Carl Bosch (1874–1940), German chemist, Nobel laureate, and engineer
- Fàtima Bosch i Tubert (b. 1957), Catalan doctor in pharmacy
- Irene Bosch, Venezuelan biologist and researcher
- Jan Bosch (b. 1967), Dutch computer scientist
- Leendert Bosch (1924–2017), Dutch biochemist
- Pere Bosch-Gimpera (1891–1974), Catalan-born Mexican archaeologist and anthropologist
- Robert A. Bosch (b. 1963), American author and recreational mathematician
- Siegfried Bosch (b. 1944), German mathematician

== In sport ==
- Anneke Bosch (b. 1990s), South African cricketer
- Christopher Bosch (b. 1992), South African rugby player
- Clayton Bosch (b. 1992), South African cricketer
- Corbin Bosch (b. 1997), South African cricketer
- Cristian Bosch, Argentinian kickboxer
- Crisant Bosch (1907–1981), Catalan footballer
- Curwin Bosch (b. 1997), South African rugby player
- Don Bosch (b. 1942), American baseball player
- Dylan Bosch (b. 1998), South African swimmer
- Eathan Bosch (b. 1997), South African cricketer
- Edith Bosch (born 1980), Dutch judoka
- Emma Bosch (1971–1994), Catalan alpine skier
- Facundo Bosch (b. 1991), Argentine rugby player
- Frank Bosch (b. 1945), American football player
- Gerard Bosch van Drakestein (1887–1972), Dutch track cyclist
- Hermann Bosch (1891–1916), German footballer
- John Bosch (b. 1964), Dutch racing car driver
- Jurjen Bosch (b. 1985), Dutch footballer
- Manel Bosch (b. 1967), Catalan basketball player
- Marcelo Bosch (b. 1984), Argentine rugby player
- Mariano Bosch (b. 1962), Argentine rugby player and coach
- Mónica Bosch (b. 1972), Catalan alpine skier
- Nadir Bosch (b. 1973), French middle-distance runner
- Patrick Bosch (1964–2012), Dutch footballer
- Paul Bosch (b. 1984), South African rugby union player
- Ruud Bosch (b. 1984), Dutch badminton player
- Tertius Bosch (1966–2000), South African cricketer

== Other people ==
- Mariette Bosch (1950–2001), South African executed for murder by Botswana
- Mineke Bosch (born 1954), Dutch historian

== See also ==
- Boesch, Bösch, Bosch, Busch, Busche, Bush, Busk, Van den Bos, Van den Bosch, Van den Bossche, Von dem Busche
