= Bysshe =

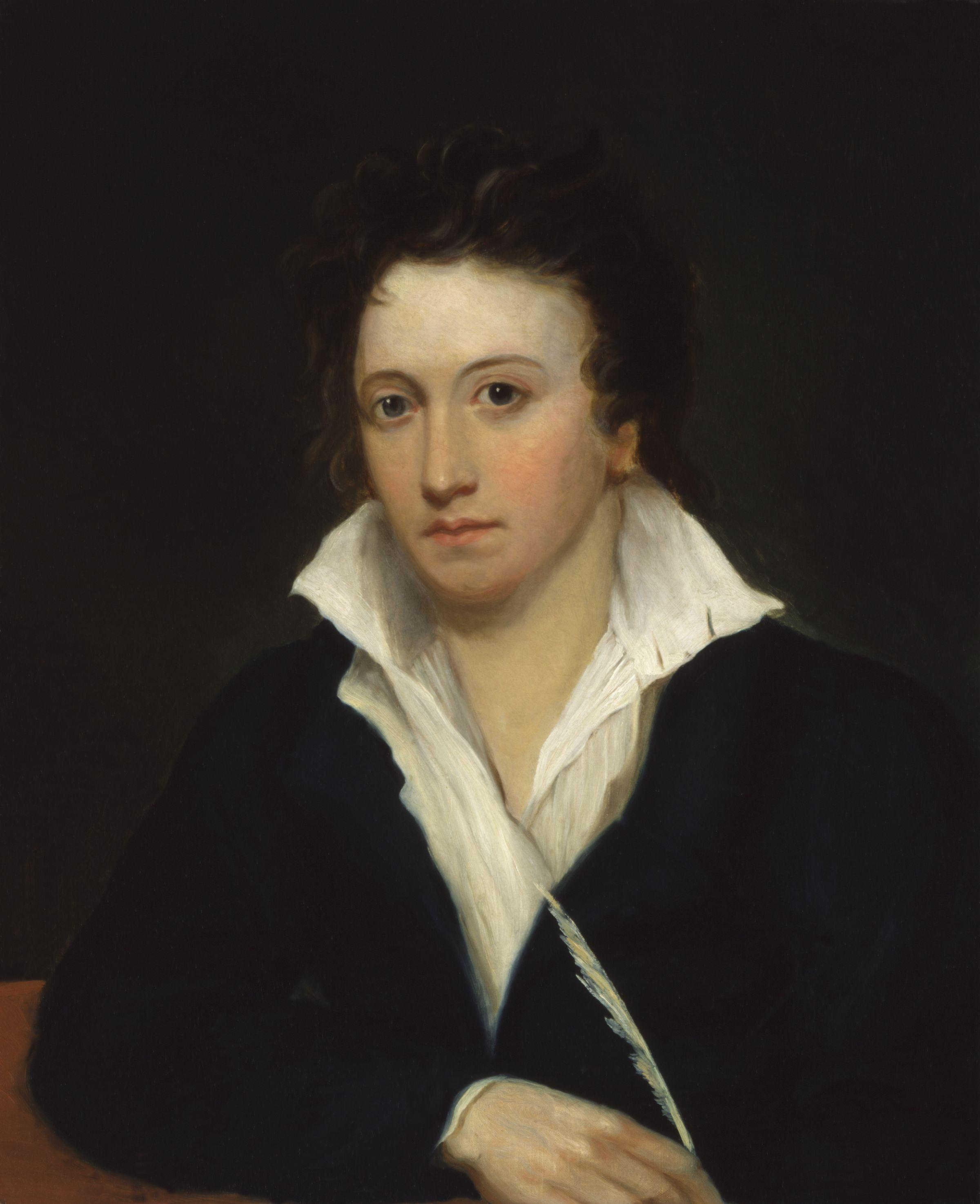
Percy Bysshe Shelley, English poet, a notable bearer of the name

Bysshe is a surname sometimes used as a given name. It has been said that it is a variation of the surname Bush.

La Bysshe or Bysshe Court was a property in the parish of Horne in Surrey, England, by 1355. In 1629 it came into the ownership of Edward Bysshe (died 1655), father of Edward Bysshe (1615?–1679), and said to be a descendant of William Bysshe whose brother Thomas Bysshe had held the estate in the late 14th century. East Bysshe Farmhouse is a grade II listed building in the parish, built in the 17th century and extended and altered in the 19th century.

== People ==
Notable people with the name include:

- Edward Bysshe (died 1655), English member of Parliament elected for Bletchingley (UK Parliament constituency) between 1624 and April 1640, father of Edward (1615–1678)
- Edward Bysshe (1615?–1679), English barrister, FRS, politician and officer of arms, Member of Parliament for Bletchingley (November 1640 and 1661), Reigate (1654) and Gatton (1659); son of Edward (died 1655)
- Edward Bysshe (writer) (fl. 1712), English writer
- Sir Bysshe Shelley, 1st Baronet (1731–1815), baronet of Castle Goring, grandfather of Percy Bysshe Shelley
- Percy Bysshe Shelley (1792–1822), English poet, grandson of Sir Bysshe Shelley, 1st Baronet
- Bysshe Vanolis (1834–1882), pseudonym of Scottish poet James Thomson
