= Bussche =

Bussche is a German surname. Notable people with the surname include:

- Bussche family, an old East-East-Westphalian German noble family
- Axel von dem Bussche (1919–1993), German officer during World War II
- Baroness Gösta von dem Bussche-Haddenhausen (1902–1996), German noblewoman and the mother of Prince Claus of the Netherlands.
- Charles Van Den Bussche (1876–1958), Belgian sailor who competed in the 1920 Summer Olympics
- Georg Wilhelm von dem Bussche (1726–1794), Hanoverian Army officer and nobleman
- Hilmar von dem Bussche-Haddenhausen (1867–1939), German nobleman and a diplomat

== See also ==
- Vandenbussche
