= Robert Bosch (disambiguation) =

Robert Bosch (1861–1942) was a German industrialist and founder of Robert Bosch GmbH.

Robert Bosch may also refer to:

- Robert Bosch Jr. (1928–2004), American businessman and entrepreneur
- Robert A. Bosch (born 1963), American author and recreational mathematician
- Robert Bosch GmbH, a German multinational engineering and technology company
