= Joe Bush =

Joe Bush may refer to:

- Bullet Joe Bush (1892–1974), Major League Baseball pitcher
- Joe Bush (American football), American football coach and athletic director
- Joe Bush (ghost), American legend
- Joe Bush (organ grinder), American organ grinder
- Joe Bush (racing driver), NASCAR driver
