= Pieter van den Bosch =

Pieter van den Bosch may refer to:

- Pieter Van den Bosch (footballer) (1927–2009), Belgian footballer
- Pieter van den Bosch (painter) (1612–c. 1673), Dutch artist

== See also ==
- Peter Van Den Bossche, professor of international economic law
