= Jaume Bosch =

Jaume Bosch may refer to:

- Jacques Bosch or Jaume Bosch (1826–1895), Spanish guitarist in Paris
- Jaume Bosch i Puges, mayor of Sant Boi de Llobregat, Socialists' Party of Catalonia, PSC
- Miguel Jaume y Bosch (1844–1900), Spanish painter who lived most of his life in Montevideo, Uruguay
