= Peter Bush =

Peter Bush or Pete Bush may refer to:

== Sports ==
- Peter Bush (badminton), English badminton player, in Hungarian International
- Peter Bush (wrestler), American sport wrestler, see Wrestling at the 1983 Pan American Games
- Pete Bush from Iowa Hawkeyes wrestling

== Others ==
- Peter Bush (businessman) (born 1952), Australian businessman
- Pete Bush, keyboardist from the band Toyah
- Peter Bush (translator) (born 1946), British translator
- Peter Bush (photographer) (1930–2023), New Zealand photojournalist
- Peter Bush, actor in I Was a Teenage Zombie
