= Brunsbüttel =

- Town
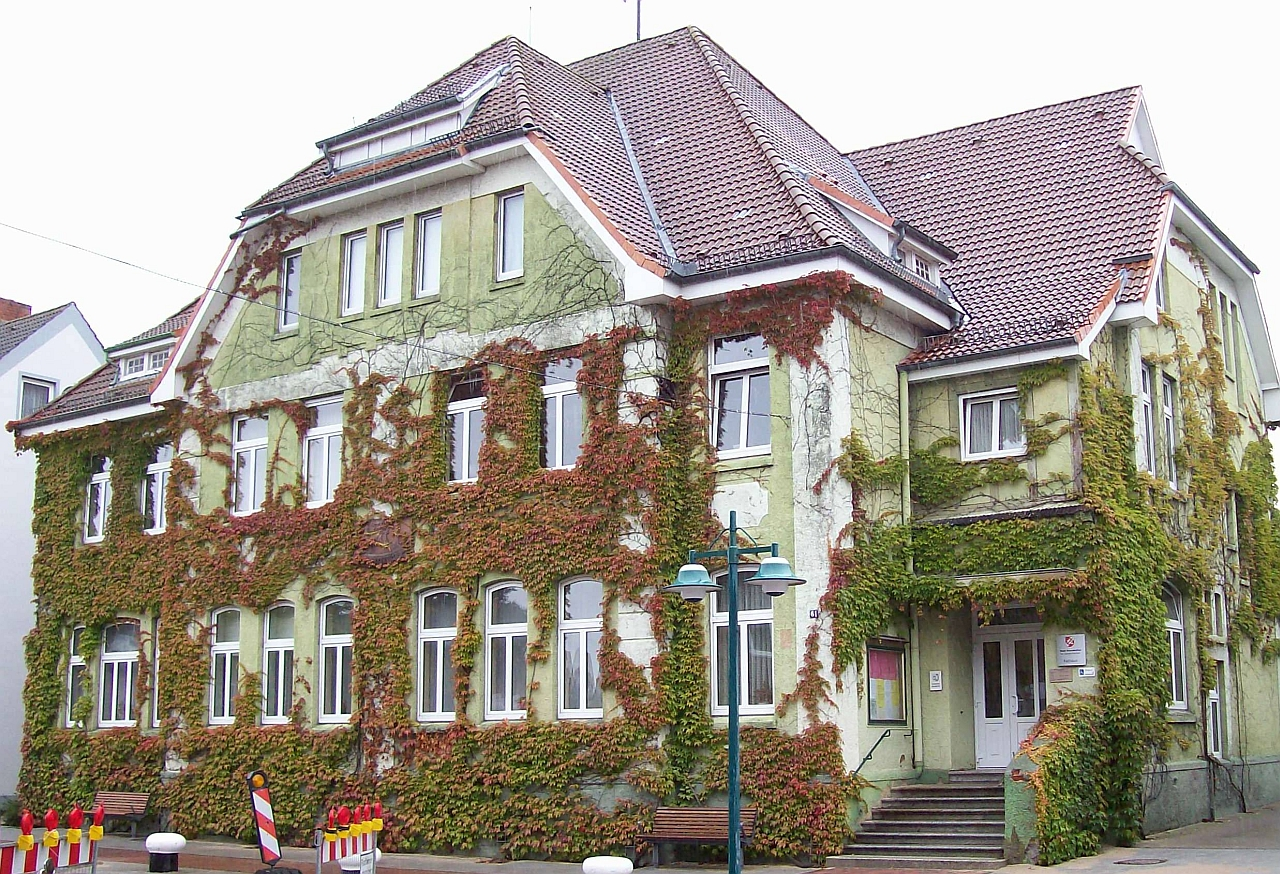
- Town hall in Brunsbüttel

- Flag Coat of arms

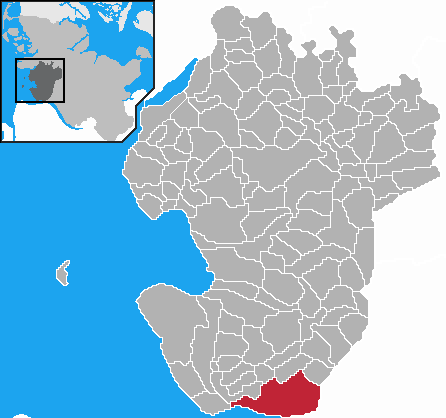
- Location of Brunsbüttel within Dithmarschen district
- Interactive map of Brunsbüttel
- Location within Germany Location within Schleswig-Holstein
- Coordinates: 53°53′47″N 09°08′19″E
- Country: Germany
- State: Schleswig-Holstein
- District: Dithmarschen

Government
  - Mayor: Martin Schmedtje

Area
  - Total: 65.21 km^{2} (25.18 sq mi)
- Elevation: 1 m (3.3 ft)

Population (2025-12-31)
  - Total: 12,640
  - Density: 193.8/km^{2} (502.0/sq mi)
- Time zone: UTC+01:00 (CET)
  - Summer (DST): UTC+02:00 (CEST)
- Postal codes: 25534–25541
- Dialling codes: 04851, 04852, 04855
- Vehicle registration: HEI
- Website: www.brunsbuettel.de

Brunsbüttel (German pronunciation: [ˈbʁʊnsbʏtl̩]; Northern Low Saxon: Bruunsbüddel) is an industrial and harbour town in the district of Dithmarschen, in Schleswig-Holstein, northern Germany that lies at the mouth of the Elbe river, near the North Sea. It is the location of the western entrance to the Kiel Canal.

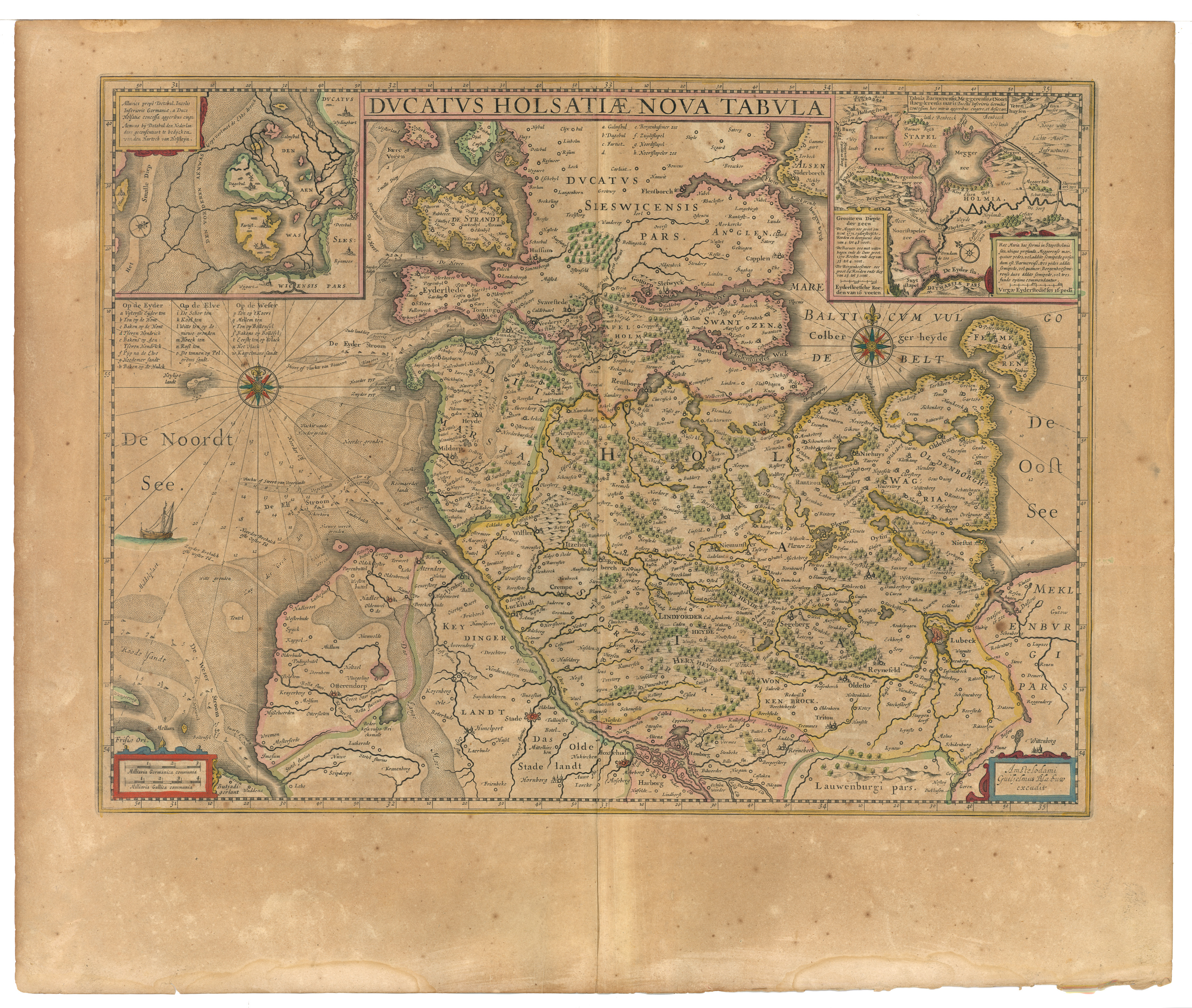
Brunsbuttel in 1645, Atlas Maior von Blaeu

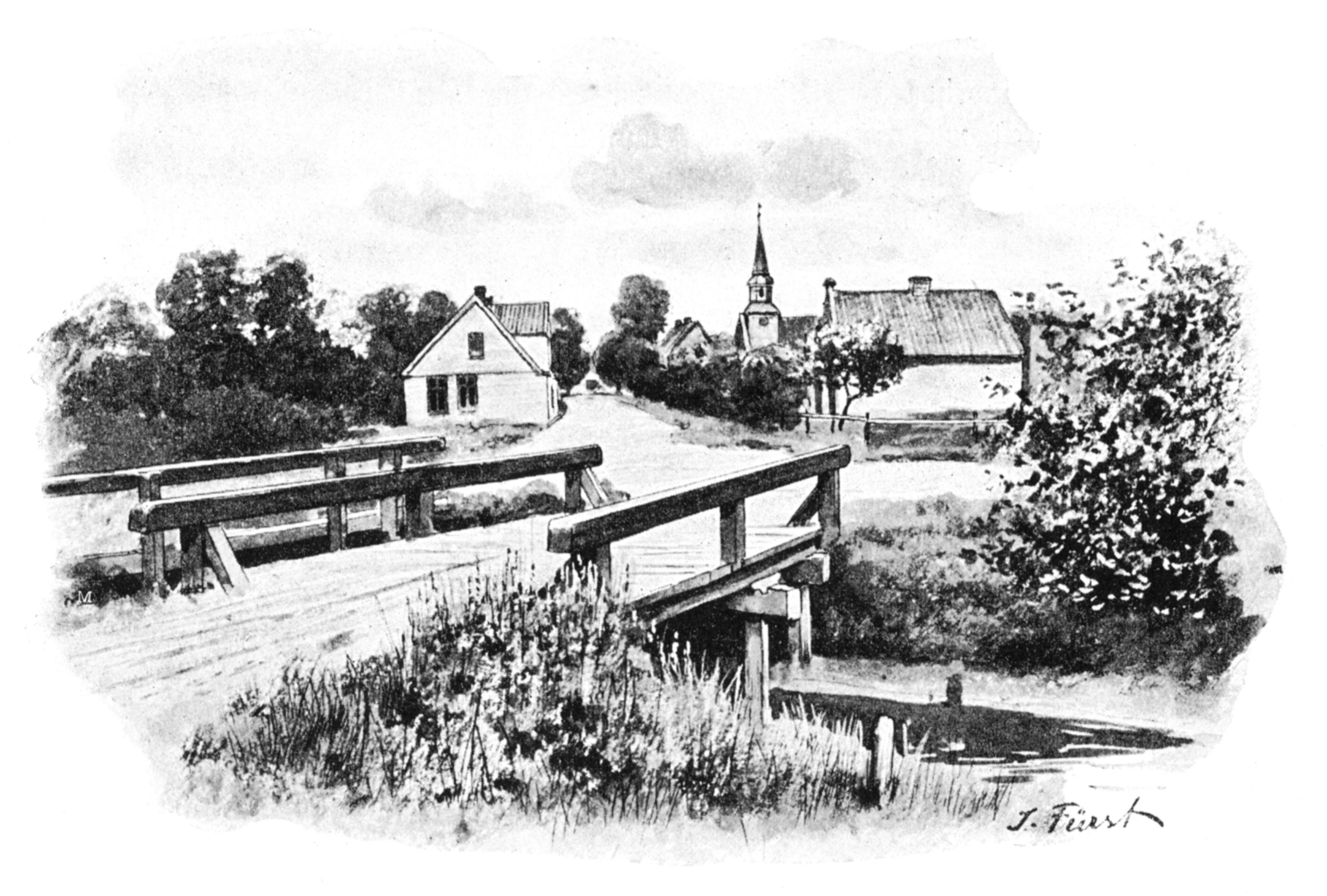
Brunsbüttel in 1895

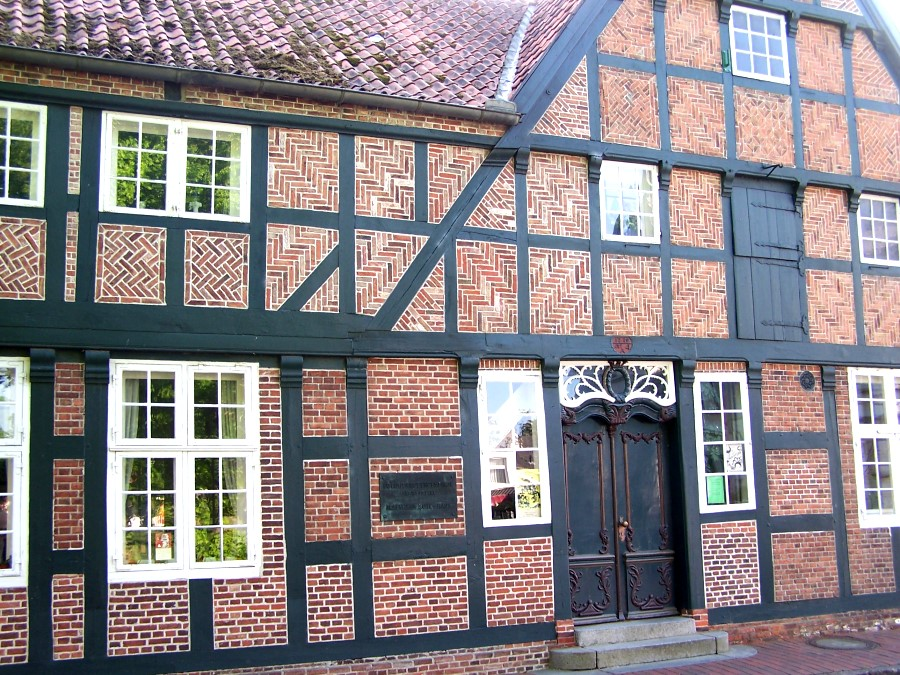
Matthias-Boie-Haus / Ähren- und Flechtverbund

== History ==
The earliest reference to the town is in a document dated 14 July 1286.

With the construction of the Kiel Canal (German: Nord-Ostsee-Kanal) in 1911, the town was divided in two.

During the opening days of World War II, on 4 September 1939, the No. 149 Squadron RAF carried out the second bombing of that war, targeting warships near the town.

== Economy ==
Brunsbüttel became an industrial area in the 1960s and 1970s. The ChemCoast Park Brunsbüttel is still the most important enterprise zone and at 2,000 hectares (4,900 acres) also the largest industrial area in Schleswig-Holstein.

=== Chemical plants ===
- Total S.A.
- Bayer MaterialScience
- Lanxess
- Sasol
- Yara International

=== Energy ===
- Vattenfall: Gas Turbine Power Station (near the Brunsbüttel Nuclear Power Plant which is out of service)
- A terminal to import 8 billion cubic metres per annum (280 billion cubic feet per annum) of liquefied natural gas is under construction. Originally expected to become operational in approximately 2026, following the invasion of Ukraine by Russia it may now become operational by winter 2022/23.

=== Harbours ===
- Brunsbüttel Ports GmbH (port operation and logistics)

== Twin towns and sister cities ==
Brunsbüttel is twinned with:

- Horní Počernice (Prague 20), Czech Republic (2004)

== Notable residents ==
- Horst Wohlers (born 1949), former football player, played 301 pro games, then a manager
- Dirk Busch (born 1951 in Brunsbüttelkoog), a professor, singer, songwriter, composer and music producer.
- Jennifer Oeser (born 1983), heptathlete
