= Thomas Bush =

Thomas or Tom Bush may refer to:

- Tom Bush (rugby league) (born 1990), English rugby league player
- Tom Bush (footballer, born 1914) (1914–1969), English footballer
- Tom Bush (Australian footballer) (1918–1951), Australian rules footballer
- Tom Bush (politician) (born 1948), politician and lawyer in the American state of Florida
- Tom Bush (basketball) in Cleveland Cavaliers draft history
- Thomas M. Bush, racehorse trainer in Turf Classic Stakes

== See also ==
- Tommy Bush (1928–2003), American actor
