= John Bush =

John Bush may refer to:

== Arts and entertainment ==
- Jack Bush (John Hamilton Bush, 1909–1977), Canadian painter
- Johnny Bush (1935–2020), American country music singer
- John Bush (singer) (born 1963), American heavy metal vocalist for Armored Saint and Anthrax
- John Bush (filmmaker), American filmmaker, cinematographer, and visual artist
- John Bush (set decorator), British set decorator

== Law and politics ==
- John Bush (English politician) (fl. 1411–1426), MP for Cambridge
- John Bush (High Sheriff) (c. 1745–?), High Sheriff of Oxfordshire
- John T. Bush (1811–1888), American politician in New York
- John E. Bush (Hawaii politician) (1842–1906), Governor of Kauai
- John Barnard Bush (born 1937), Lord Lieutenant of Wiltshire
- Jeb Bush (John Ellis Bush, born 1953), American politician in Florida
- John K. Bush (born 1964), American jurist

== Sports ==
- John Bush (New Zealand cricketer) (1867–1913)
- John Bush (English cricketer) (1928–2015)
- Johnny Bush (racing driver) (born 1954), American stock car racing driver

== Other people ==
- John Bush (provincial soldier) (fl. 1750s), African American soldier
- John Bush (admiral of Siam) (1819–1905), English sea captain
- John E. Bush (Mosaic Templars of America) (1856–1916), co-founder of the Mosaic Templars of America
- John Bush (Royal Navy officer) (1914–2013), British Royal Navy officer

== See also ==
- Jon Busch (born 1976), American soccer player
- Jonathan Bush (Jonathan James Bush, 1931–2021), American banker and political fundraiser
- Jonathan S. Bush (born 1969), American health care businessman
- Jonathan Bushe (born 1978), Irish cricketer
