= Mirjam Bos =

Dutch human rights activist (born 1989)

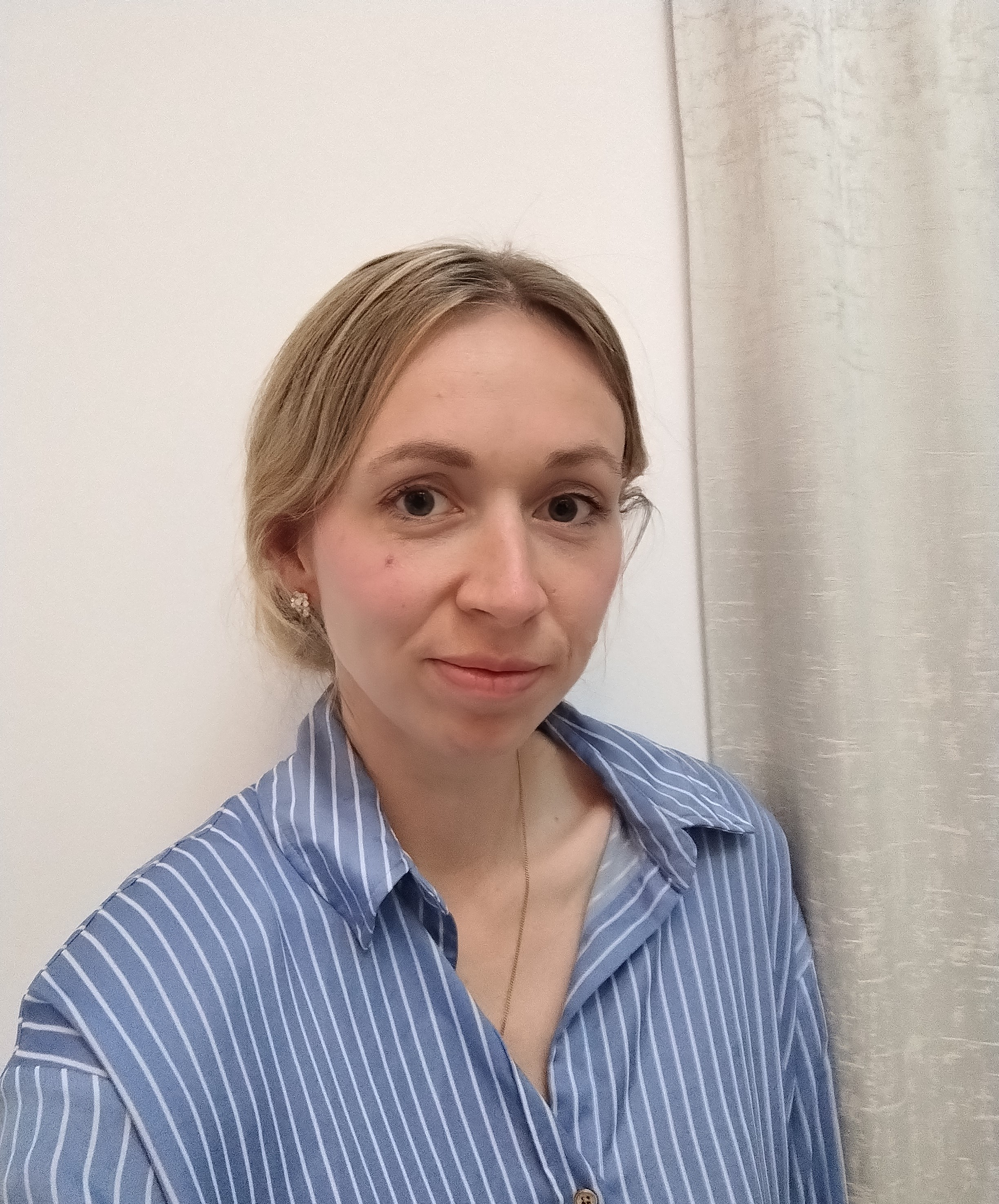
- Born: May 1989 (age 37); Netherlands
- Occupation: Human rights activist
- Spouse: Joseph Janssen (m. 2018)
- Children: 2

Mirjam Bos (born May 1989, Netherlands) is a Dutch human rights activist known for her advocacy for religious freedom and support for persecuted individuals worldwide. She has worked extensively in political advocacy, focusing on the protection of religious minorities and combating modern-day slavery, including sex trafficking and child exploitation. Bos is also involved in projects that provide education to children in Pakistan and offers legal support to those imprisoned due to their faith.

== Career ==
Following her graduation, Bos began working for the Jubilee Campaign, an organization dedicated to advocating for human rights and religious freedom and served as the Program Officer for Jubilee Campaign Netherlands in 2017. In this role, she worked closely with teams in the United States and the Netherlands, focusing on supporting persecuted Christians. Her work involved writing reports, engaging in political lobbying, and organizing demonstrations. Bos also took part in fact-finding missions to countries such as Iraq, Nigeria, Pakistan, Sri Lanka, and Thailand, meeting individuals affected by religious persecution.

Bos became increasingly involved in international advocacy, attending and hosting events at the United Nations and the European Union. These platforms allowed her to raise awareness of religious freedom issues, and she participated in political lobbying efforts in several countries, including the Netherlands, the United States, and the United Kingdom. Bos also spent time living in Brussels, where she became more active in lobbying for religious freedom within the European Union.

In October 2024, Bos condemned the wrongful arrest of a Christian father in Pakistan. The man was detained after his 13-year-old daughter, Roshni, returned home following her escape from a husband who had been attempting to sell her into sexual slavery to a family in Saudi Arabia. Bos expressed her outrage over the incident, calling it "beyond terrible," and highlighted the failure of authorities to protect vulnerable children from exploitation.

== Personal life ==
Mirjam Bos is married to Joseph Janssen. They have two children.
