= Matt Bush =

Matt Bush is the name of:

- Matt Bush (actor) (born 1986), American actor
- Matt Bush (baseball) (born 1986), American baseball pitcher
- Matt Bush (taekwondo) (born 1988), Welsh para taekwondo practitioner

== See also ==
- Bush (surname)
