= Busch (surname) =

Busch is a German surname, a cognate of Bush. Notable people with the surname include:

- Adam Busch (born 1978), American actor
- Adolf Busch (1891–1952), German violinist and composer
- Adolphus Busch (1839–1913), founder of Anheuser-Busch
- Adolphus Busch III (1891–1946), 3rd generation brewing magnate
- Alexandra W. Busch
- August Anheuser Busch Sr. (1865–1934), 2nd generation brewing magnate
- August Busch III (born 1937), 4th generation brewing magnate
- August Busch IV (born 1964), 5th generation brewing magnate
- August Ludwig Busch (1804–1855), German astronomer
- Charles Busch (born 1954), American actor
- Christian Busch (disambiguation), multiple persons:
- Christian Busch (gymnast) (1880–1977) German gymnast
- Christian Busch (management scientist) (born 1984) management scientist, Professor at the Marshall School of Business
- Dirk Busch (born 1951), German professor, singer, and songwriter
- Ebba Busch (born 1987), Swedish politician, leader of the Christian Democrats
- Elizaveta Busch (1886–1960), Russian botanist
- Erika Büsch (born 1974), Uruguayan musician
- Ernst Busch (field marshal) (1885–1945), German field marshal
- Ernst Busch (actor) (1900–1980), German singer and actor
- Fritz Busch (1890–1951), German conductor
- Fredric N. Busch (born 1958), American psychiatrist and psychoanalyst
- Germán Busch (1904–1939), president of Bolivia
- Gidone Busch (1968–1999), Hasidic Jew who was shot to death by officers of the NYPD in Borough Park, Brooklyn
- Gundi Busch (1935–2014), German figure skater and coach
- Gussie Busch (1899–1989), 3rd generation brewing magnate
- Hans Busch (1884–1973), German physicist
- Joe Busch (1907–1999), Australian rugby league footballer
- Johannes Busch (1399–c. 1480), theologian
- Jon Busch (born 1976), American professional soccer player
- Julius Hermann Moritz Busch (1821–1899), German publicist who published the memoirs of Bismarck
- Kurt Busch (born 1978), American NASCAR driver
- Kyle Busch (1985–2026), American NASCAR driver, brother of Kurt
- Lou Busch (1910–1979), American musician and songwriter
- Mae Busch (1891–1946), Australian actress
- Michael E. Busch (1947–2019), speaker of the Maryland House of Delegates
- Neil Busch, American musician
- Nikolai Busch (1869–1941), Russian botanist
- Niven Busch (1903–1991), American novelist
- Pablo Busch (1867–1950), German-born explorer, physician, and politician
- Paul Busch (physicist) (1955–2018), German mathematical physicist
- Rene Busch (born 1971), Estonian tennis player
- Roland Busch (born 1964), German business executive and physicist
- Tim Busch, American conservative Catholic businessman and philanthropist
- Wilhelm Busch (1832–1908), German poet and caricaturist

== See also ==
- Boesch, Bösch, Bosch, Busch, Busche, Bush, Busk, Van den Bos, Van den Bosch, Van den Bossche, Von dem Busche
