= Christian Busch =

Christian Busch may refer to:

- Christian Busch (gymnast) (1880–1977) German gymnast
- Christian Busch (management scientist) (born 1984) management scientist, Professor at the Marshall School of Business
