= Marike Bok =

Dutch painter (1943–2017)

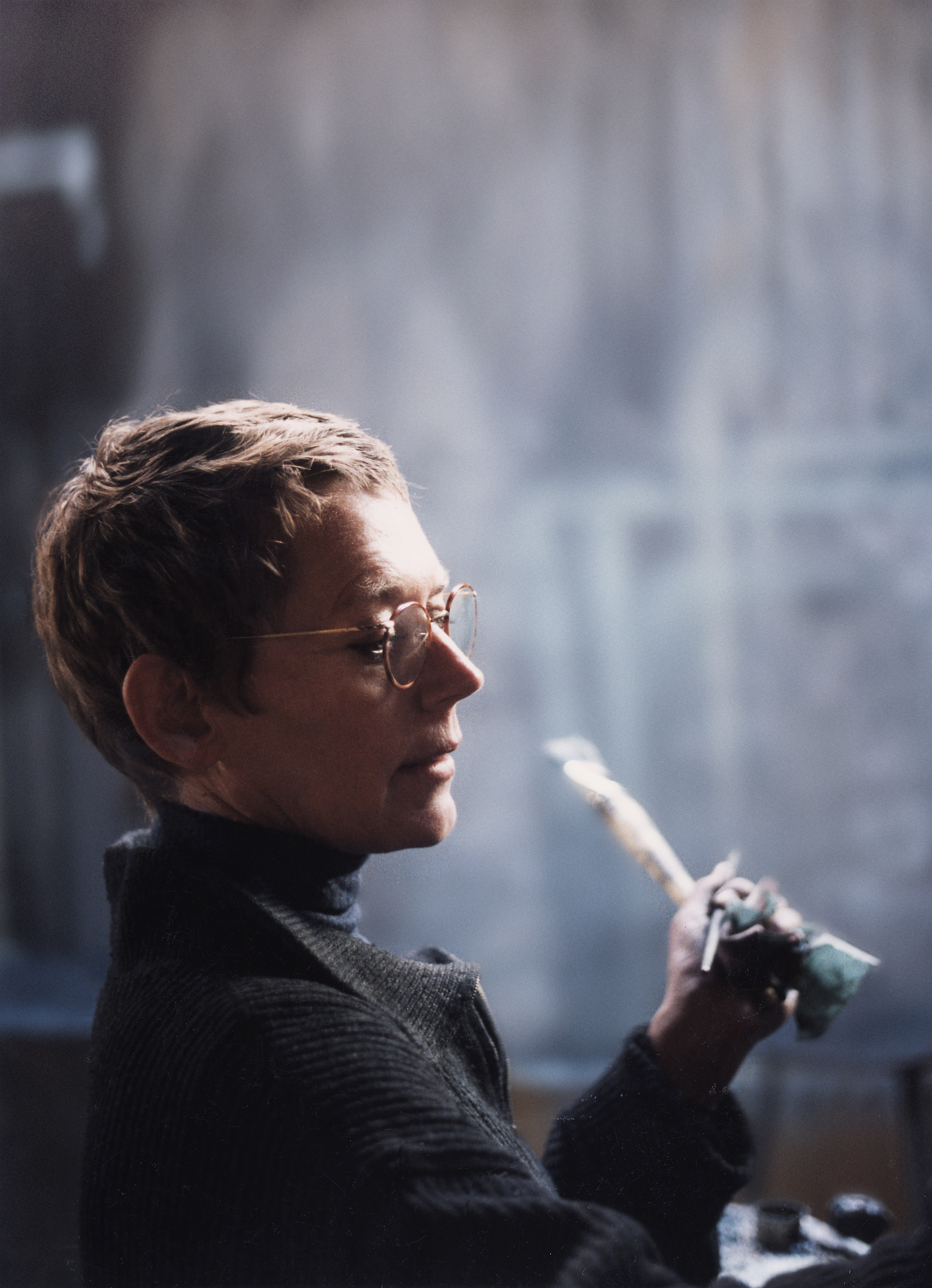
- Born: Martina Diederika Bok; 17 January 1943; Amsterdam, Netherlands
- Died: 12 June 2017 (aged 74); The Hague
- Education: Royal Academy of Art, The Hague
- Known for: Painting, printmaking, drawing
- Notable work: The Gentlemen's club, Beatrix of the Netherlands, President of the Supreme Court, Conductor of The Royal Theater The Hague
- Movement: Modern Baroque
- Spouse: Rinus van den Bosch

Marike Bok (17 January 1943 – 12 June 2017) was a Dutch portrait painter.

== Life and work ==
Bok studied at the Royal Art Academy in The Hague. Bok painted the Dutch Queen Beatrix twice. In 1995 she painted the Gentleman's Club (De heren club). This painting is a group portrait of some well-known Dutch artists and politicians like Marcel van Dam, Harry Mulisch, Hans van Mierlo, Reinbert de Leeuw, Martin Veltman, Gerrit Komrij, Adriaan van Dis and André Spoor. In 2011 she painted former prime minister of the Netherlands Ruud Lubbers. Marike Bok was often compared with classic Dutch painters like Frans Hals because of her technique and also because she was the only modern portrait painter who never worked from photographs and exactly painted like the old Dutch masters.

== Gallery ==
Portraits by Marike Bok

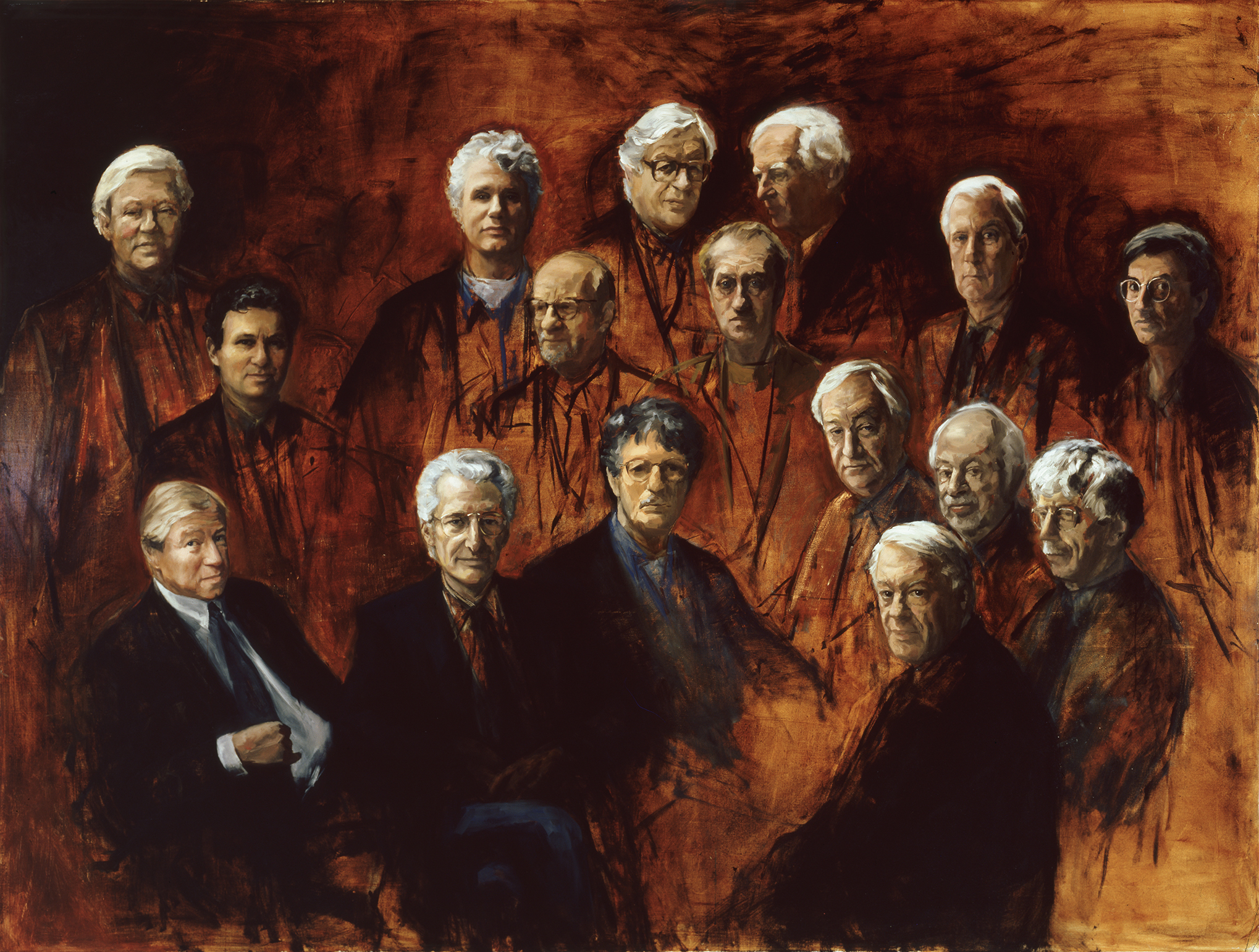
Portrait of the Dutch Gentleman's club with famous writers and intellectuals (1995), painted by Marike Bok.

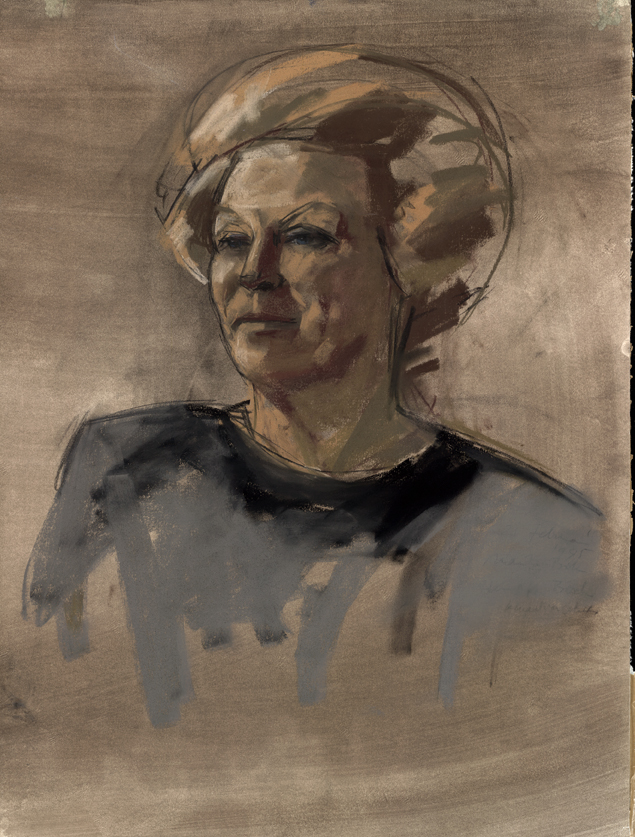
Portrait of Beatrix of the Netherlands (1995), painted by Marike Bok.

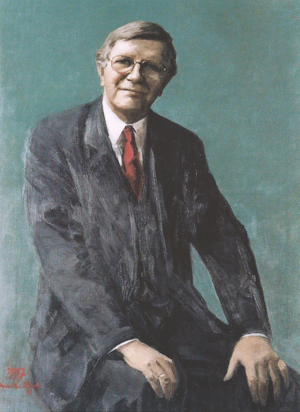
Lammert Leertouwer

== Books ==
In 2016 Marike Bok suffered from a stroke that made painting in the last year before she deceased very difficult. In September 2017 the book Marike Bok was published. A biography of her life and work. the author is Diederiekje Bok.

- Marike Bok, ogen van een klok (2017), (Dutch) Diederiekje Bok, ISBN 9789082737202
- Rinus (2017), (Dutch) Willem Otterspeer, ISBN 9789072603111
- Flarden van een stem (2009), (Dutch) Willem Otterspeer, ISBN 9789023456810

== Exhibitions ==
- 1995 Museum Mesdag, The Hague (The Netherlands) Portrait Queen Beatrix (Exhibition)
- 1996 Historical Museum, Amsterdam. Painting 'De Herenclub' (Gentleman's club)
- 1997 Tweede Kamer, The Hague (The Netherlands) Portrait Dick Dolman
- 1998 Oranje Boven, Portrait Queen Beatrix
- 2000 Nieuwspoort, The Hague (The Netherlands) Minister Jorritsma
- 2000 Hoge Raad der Nederlanden (Generaal B.A.C. Droste)
- 2000 Dutch Royal Air Force portrait gallery
- 2000 Pulchri Studio, The Hague (The Netherlands)
- 2002 Pulchri Studio, The Hague (The Netherlands)
