= Busk (surname) =

Busk is a surname. Notable people with the surname include:

- Douglas Busk (1906–1990), British diplomat, mountaineer and geographer
- Edward Teshmaker Busk (1886–1914), aeronautical pioneer
- George Busk (1807–1886), British naval surgeon, zoologist and palaeontologist
- Hans Busk, the elder (1772–1862), poet
- Hans Busk, the younger (1815–1882), shootist
- Niels Busk (born 1942), Danish politician
- Rachel Harriette Busk, traveller, collector of tales, writer
- Richard Busk (1895–1961), English cricketer
- Søren Busk (born 1953), Danish football player

== See also ==
- Busk Medal, awarded by Royal Geographical Society
- Boesch, Bösch, Bosch, Busch, Busche, Bush, Busk, Van den Bos, Van den Bosch, Van den Bossche, Von dem Busche
