= Van den Bosch =

Van den Bosch (pronounced [vɑn dɛm ˈbɔs]) is a Dutch toponymic surname, originally indicating either an association with a forest (bosch, modern Dutch bos), with a place/dwelling named "Den Bosch" or with the city Den Bosch. In the Netherlands about 10,200 carried the name in 2007, while in Belgium 3,755 people were named Van Den Bosch and another 3,164 were named Vandenbosch, Vandebosch or Vanden Bosch in 2008. Other variant spellings are Van der Bosch, Van den Bos, Van den Bossche and Vandenbussche.

People with this surname include:

- Annik Van den Bosch (born 1971), Belgian politician
- Antal van den Bosch (born 1969), Dutch language researcher
- Dirk van den Bosch (1906–1994), Dutch sports shooter
- Engelbertus Batavus van den Bosch (1789–1851), Dutch admiral and Minister of Colonies
- François Van Den Bosch (born 1934), Belgian cyclist
- Hippolyte Van den Bosch (1926–2011), Belgian footballer
- Jean Van Den Bosch (1898–1985), Belgian cyclist
- Jean van den Bosch (1910–1985), Belgian diplomat
- Jean Van den Bosch, guitarist and vocalist of The Vipers Skiffle Group
- Johannes van den Bosch (1780–1844), Dutch Minister of State and Governor-General of the Dutch East Indies
- Johannes van den Bosch (1906–1994), Dutch chess player
- Johannes Adrianus van den Bosch (1813–1870), Dutch officer and politician; Minister of War from 1866 to 1868
- Kyle Vanden Bosch (b. 1978), American football player
- Linde van den Bosch (b. 1963), Dutch linguist
- Monique van den Bosch (b. 1964), Dutch wheelchair tennis player
- Pieter van den Bosch (1612–1673), Dutch painter
- Pieter Van den Bosch (1927–2009), Belgian footballer
- Rinus van den Bosch (1938–1996), Dutch artist
- Robert Vandenbosch (1932–2024), American chemist
- Roelof Benjamin van den Bosch (1810–1862), Dutch botanist
- Tjalling van den Bosch (b. 1958), Dutch strongman
- Tom Van Den Bosch (b. 1985), Belgian cyclo-cross racer

Van der Bosch

- Peter van der Bosch (1686–1736), Flemish Jesuit hagiographer

Vandebosch

- Ingrid Vandebosch (b. 1970), Belgian model

== See also ==
- Boesch, Bösch, Bosch, Busch, Busche, Bush, Busk, Van den Bos, Van den Bosch, Van den Bossche, Von dem Busche
- Van den Bosch (noble family), Dutch noble family
- Fort van den Bosch a fort on Java named after Governor General Johannes van den Bosch
- Vandenboschia, fern genus named after Roelof Benjamin van den Bosch
