= Roger Bush =

Roger Bush may refer to:

- Roger Bush (minister) (1918–2000), British-born Australian Methodist minister and media personality
- Roger Bush (priest) (born 1956), British Anglican priest
- Roger Bush (musician) (born 1940), American bassist and guitarist
