= Agnes van den Bossche =

15th-century Flemish painter

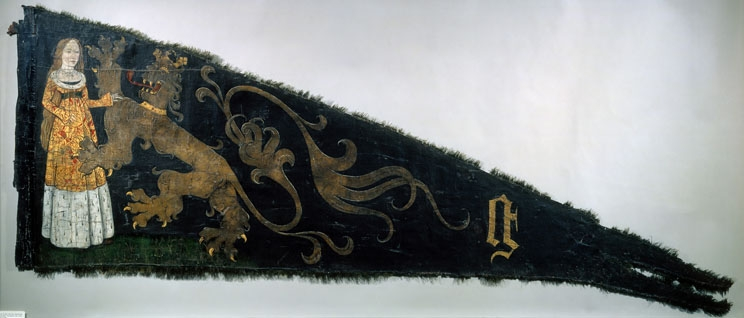
The Maid of Ghent - Flag of the City of Ghent, 1481–82. 100 x 265cm, STAM Museum, Ghent

Agnes van den Bossche (c. 1435-40 – c. 1504) was a Flemish painter working in Ghent in the mid-to-late 15th century.

She is one of the few known women admitted to the painter's guild of Ghent, and worked mainly on designing flags and banners. Although these are records of numerous commissions, she is known today for her one extant work, the triangular banner The Maid of Ghent, the only recorded painting by a Flemish woman of the 15th century.

== Life and career ==
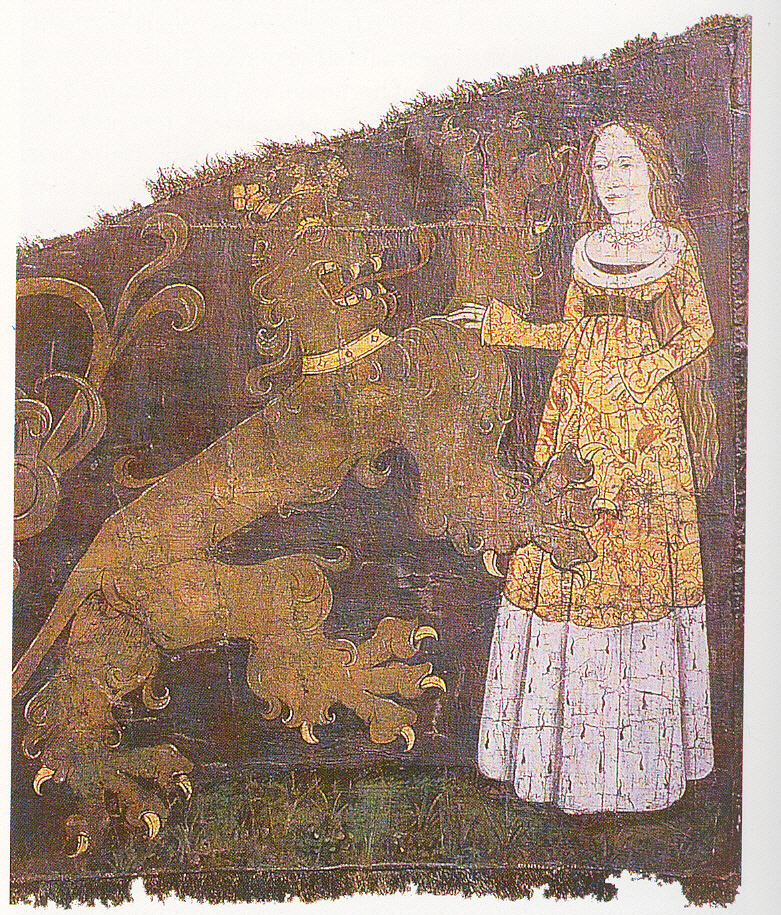
Agnes van den Bossche, detail of the Maid of Ghent

Agnes van den Bossche's exact date of birth is unknown, but it was probably c. 1435–1440 in Ghent. A number of records of her life exist. She came from a family of well-regarded painters, including her father Tristran, a master painter in Ghent, and brother Lievin. When she was admitted to the guild of artists, Joos van Ghent acted as her guarantor. Van Ghent had earlier acted in the same role for the renowned master Hugo van der Goes. She married Heinrica Crabbe, of whom we know nothing, but was widowed in 1468. Her only surviving work is the 1481–82 Maid of Ghent, one of a series of flags commissioned by the city government of Ghent. Other known city commissions include blazons and pennons for trumpets between 1474 and 1475, and for a number of flags in 1476–77 for the Joyous Entry of Duchess Marie. She developed a baldachin for a statue of the Virgin at the Cathedral of Our Lady, Tournai, decorating the statue three times in her career. A 1483–84 commission included a pennon depicting St. Anthony and the Maid of Ghent.

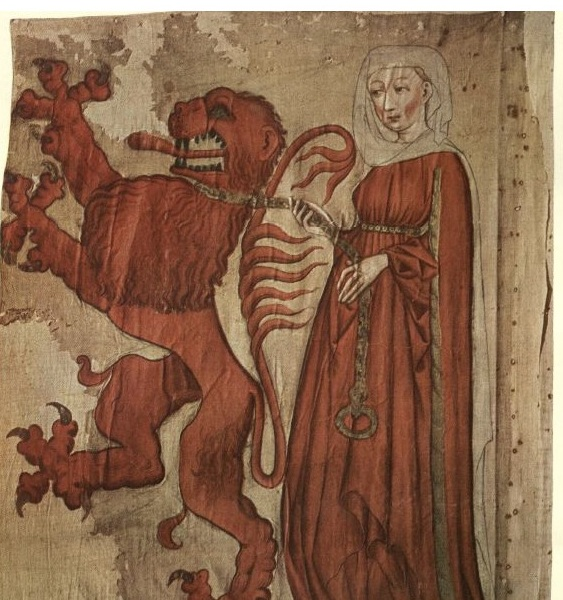
Unknown artist, Flag of Frauenfeld, 15th century, Historisches Museum, Frauenfeld. A very similar design, but with a somewhat more matronly maid

Although van den Bossche was well regarded by the city's commissioners, as an artist she seems to have been of the second rank. Two factors indicate this. Her only extant work was painted on canvas support, the cheapest available material for a flag of this kind. Second, flags, banners, blazons and pennons were not formats of the highest painters; there is no evidence that she worked on panel paintings, altarpieces or devotional art of any kind.

The Maid of Ghent is painted on both sides with oil on linen, and is decorated along the edges of the green silk fringes with embroidery. It contains a large gilded letter "G" in Gothic lettering, representing the city of Ghent. The maid acts as a symbol of the then besieged city, and is depicted with the body type ideal in the late Gothic style. She stands on a patch of grass and flowers, while her hand rests on and holds back a large heraldically designed red lion. The lion is generically rendered, and almost identical to those in other city flags, notably in two later 14th- or early 15th-century banners of Frauenfeld, Thurgau, Switzerland.

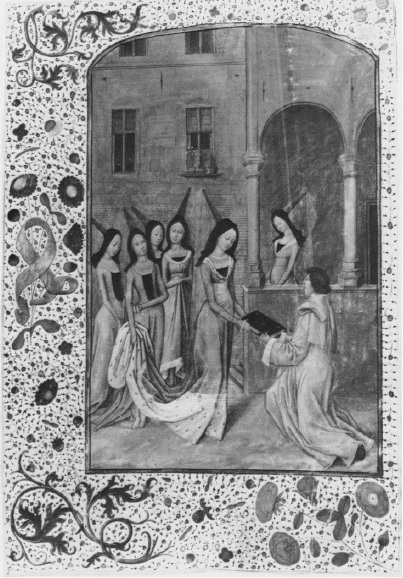
Unknown miniaturistThe scribe presenting his work to Margaret of Austria. Friedrich-Schiller Universitats bibliothek, Jena. Ms. El. f. 85, 13 V

She is dressed as a princess, in a brocade gold dress with an ermine lined collar, tight, broad waistband, and tightly pulled sleeves which widen at the cuffs. She has a high waist, petite breasts and a protruding stomach. Her collar hangs low over her upper chest, partially covering an underdress with a horizontal neckline, similar to that of the second daughter in Hans Memling's Triptych of the Family Moreel.

The flag is in good condition; it was kept unused for centuries in a government storage facility. It retains its original wooden pole. However, some of the silk fringe has been lost, as have pieces of linen from the tip and around the maid. There are cracks along parts of the paint surface, as well as some earlier repairs.

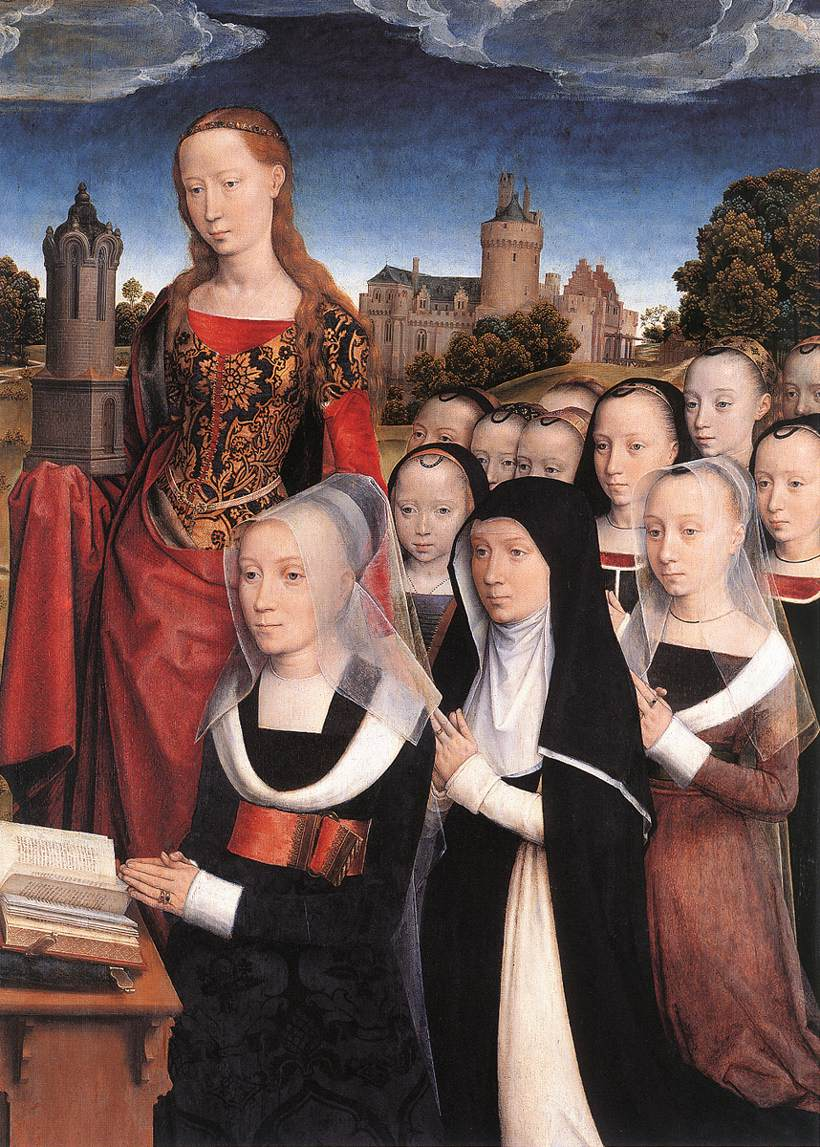
Hans Memling, Triptych of the Family Moreel, 1484

Placing the Maid of Ghent in context, art historian Diane Wolfthal observed that it "is not a work of the highest quality. While the painting carries effectively from a distance, it is crude at close range, especially the fingers and face. However, a look at Agnes van den Bossche's flag broadens our view of women painters of the time. Not only did they illuminate manuscripts, they also painted nine-foot canvases. The greatest value of the flag is historic. Not only is it, to my knowledge, the only flag painted on canvas that may be assigned with assurance to the Early Netherlandish school, it is the only documented painting by a 15th-century Flemish woman."

== Sources ==
- Wolfthal, Diane. "Agnes van den Bossche: Early Netherlandish Painter". Woman's Art Journal, Volume 6, No. 1, Spring - Summer, 1985
- Woods, Kim. Viewing Renaissance Art. CT: Yale University Press, 2007. ISBN 0-300-12343-4
