= Sydney Bush =

British optometrist (1929–2018)

Sydney Joseph Bush (1929 – 21 December 2018) was a British optometrist who practised in Hull, East Yorkshire, and who became known for promoting CardioRetinometry.

== Early life and career ==
Bush originally trained for medicine before switching to optometry. He completed the 1st MB at the University of Hull and passed Newcastle University's human anatomy examination toward the 2nd MB, BS, together with the Royal Colleges' LRCP and MRCS examinations in human physiology, before changing course to optometry. He qualified in 1953 as a diplomate of the Institute of Optical Science in London under W. J. Porter and Reginald Goode.

Bush established a private optometric practice, Bush the Opticians, in Hull in the 1950s. In the late 1990s, after installing an electronic fundus camera at his Hull practice, Bush began taking sequential retinal photographs of his contact-lens patients. He stated that he had observed reductions in retinal vascular changes in patients to whom he had recommended high doses of vitamin C and lysine and called the resulting technique "CardioRetinometry".

== Selected publications ==
- Bush, S. J. 700 Vitamin C Secrets: (and 1,000 Not So Secret for Doctors!).
- Bush, S. J. (2017). "CardioRetinometry Solves the Riddle of the Retinal Arteriolar Reflex". Advances in Ophthalmology & Visual System.
- Bush, S. J. (2017). "Cardio retinometry reveals rarely absent, focal scurvy, pathognomonic of unrecognised ubiquitous fatal occult scurvy, unexpected heart attack, thrombosis, and stroke deaths". Journal of Cardiology and Current Research.
