= Abraham Bos =

Dutch professor

Abraham P. Bos (born 1943, Baarn) is a retired professor in Ancient and Patristic philosophy at the Vrije Universiteit, Amsterdam, specializing in the philosophy of Aristotle.

His doctoral thesis in 1971 was "Een onderzoek naar de kosmologie van Aristoteles in de eerste jaren van zijn wijsgerige activiteit" (A study of the cosmology of Aristotle in the first years of his philosophical activity) His inaugural lecture in 1976 was "Providentia Divina: The Theme of Divine Pronoia in Plato and Aristotle"

He is the author, co author, or co-editor of

- Bos, Abraham P, and Rein Ferwerda. Aristotle, on the Life-Bearing Spirit (de Spiritu): A Discussion with Plato and His Predecessors on Pneuma As the Instrumental Body of the Soul: Introduction, Translation, and Commentary. Leiden : Brill, 2008. ISBN 9789004164581, a book found in 416 libraries according to WorldCat
- Bos, Abraham P. The Soul and Its Instrumental Body: A Reinterpretation of Aristotle's Philosophy of Living Nature. Leiden, Netherlands: Brill, 2003. ISBN 9789004130166
- Bos, Abraham P. Cosmic and Meta-Cosmic Theology in Aristotle's Lost Dialogues. Leiden u.a: Brill, 1989 ISBN 9789004091559
  - Translated into Italian as Teologia cosmica e metacosmica : per una nuova interpretazione dei dialoghi perduti di Aristotele ISBN 9788834302934
- Bos, Abraham P, and J N. Kraay. On the Elements: Aristotle's Early Cosmology. Assen: Van Gorcum, 1973. ISBN 9789023210276 (based on his doctoral thesis)
