= Van den Bossche =

Van den Bossche or Vandenbossche is a Dutch surname originating in Flanders. It means either "from the woods" or "from Den Bosch". Notable people with the surname include:

- Aert van den Bossche (fl. 1499–1505), Flemish painter
- Agnes van den Bossche (c.1435 – c.1504), Flemish painter
- Alain Van Den Bossche (born 1965), Belgian racing cyclist
- Balthasar van den Bossche (1681–1715), Flemish painter
- Bart Van den Bossche (1964–2013), Flemish singer
- Dany Vandenbossche (1956–2013), Belgian politician
- Darla Vandenbossche (born 1963), Canadian actress
- David Vandenbossche (born 1980), French footballer
- Fabio Van den Bossche (born 2000), Belgian cyclist
- Freya Van den Bossche (born 1975), Belgian politician
- Georges Van Den Bossche (1892–1966), Belgian rower
- Gielis van den Bossche (c.1490 – after 1545), Flemish painter
- Jules van den Bossche (1819–1889), Dutch military officer and colonial government official
- Luc Van den Bossche (born 1947), Belgian politician
- Martin Van Den Bossche (born 1941), Belgian bicycle racer
- Oscar Van Den Bossche (1893–1927), Belgian rower
- Peter Van Den Bossche (born 1959), Belgian professor of international law
- Willy Van Den Bossche (born 1949), Belgian archer
- Yani Van den Bossche (born 2001), Belgian professional footballer

== See also ==
- Boesch, Bösch, Bosch, Busch, Busche, Bush, Busk, Van den Bos, Van den Bosch, Van den Bossche, Von dem Busche
- Vandenbussche
