= William Bush =

William Bush may refer to:

- William Ernest Bush (died 1903), first and last Baron Freiherr von Bush of Coburg-Gotha
- William Henry Bush (1849–1931), American businessman and rancher
- William Sharp Bush (1786–1812), United States Marine Corps officer who was killed on the USS Constitution during the War of 1812
- William H. T. Bush (1938–2018), American businessperson
- William McKeeva Bush, first Premier of the Cayman Islands
- William Bush (cricketer) (1883–1959), New Zealand cricketer
- William Owen Bush (1832–1907), American farmer and politician in Washington state
- William Bush IV, American politician and member of the Delaware House of Representatives
- William E. Bush (1936–2001), American politician in New York
- Billy Bush (born 1971), American television personality
- Billy Bush (record producer), American record producer
- Billy "Green" Bush (born 1935), American actor
- Bill Bush (born 1949), New Zealand rugby union player
