= Dirk Busch =

German singer

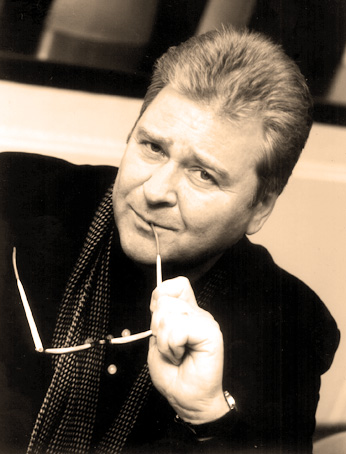
Dirk Busch

Dirk Busch (born 1950 in Brunsbüttelkoog, Kreis Dithmarschen, Schleswig-Holstein, Germany) is a German professor, singer, songwriter, composer, and music producer.

He graduated from University of Cologne in sociology, economics and psychology in 1974. Earning his doctorate (dr. rer. pol.) in 1976, he became professor of sociology in the University of Bremen. In the 1980s, he left the academic career for the musical one.

== Discography ==
This the list of LPs and single hits by Dirk Busch.

=== Albums ===
- 1981 Kinder Kinder
- 1982 Du das machen wir später
- 1983 Zeit zu leben
- 1985 Zeig doch deine Gefühle
- 1986 An diesem Morgen
- 1987 Liebeslieder und leise Töne
- 1988 Rückenwind
- 1988 Sie beißt und kratzt
- 1989 Wir Kinder wollen leben
- 1990 Bis ans Ende der Zeit
- 1991 Having a good time
- 1992 Typisch
- 1993 Zwischenbilanz
- 1993 Wenn Du mich liebst
- 1994 Mal so mal anders
- 1996 Una storia italiana (in Italian)
- 1996 Keine Tricks
- 1997 Persönlich
- 1998 Coming Home
- 1999 Es geht doch
- 2001 Beziehungsweisen
- 2002 Seven Plus Seven
- 2002 Ansichtssachen
- 2003 Balladen pur
- 2005 grundlos vergnügt
- 2006 Gute Zeiten
- 2007 Nur ein kurzer Traum
- 2008 Live in Concert – Piano & Forte

=== Single hits ===
- Du bist keine Mona Lisa
- Sie beißt und kratzt
- Liebst Du auch den rauhen Wind
- Ich zieh den Bauch nicht mehr ein
- Violinista
- Du musst deinen Weg alleine gehen
- Willkommen in der Traumfabrik
- Bis ans Ende der Zeit
- So ist sie
- Das Lied vom Knöllchenschreiber
- Immer nur lächeln
- Wie gut, dass Du kein Model bist
- Wer weiß denn heute schon was morgen passiert
- Das Kuschellied
- Das Leben geht weiter
- Sie sagt was sie denkt
- Wenn der Sommer kommt
- Urlaub auf der Autobahn
- Lieben und Leben
- Zusammen
- Ich bleib Optimist
- Mir geht's gut
- Musik ist tief in mir
- Melinda
- Nur ein kurzer Traum
