= Johnny Bos =

American boxer (1952-2013)

Johnny Bos (February 14, 1952 – May 11, 2013) was an American boxing matchmaker, writer and boxing personality. Active primarily in New York during the 1970s through the 1990s, he was known for arranging developmental bouts for fighters including Gerry Cooney, Frank Bruno and Mike Tyson.

== Early life ==
Bos was born in Brooklyn, New York. His father was a worker on the Brooklyn waterfront. Johnny Bos (Johan Bosdal) Sr had an interest in boxing, which was the inspiration for Bos Jr to be involved in boxing. Bos was a Fort Hamilton High School drop out.

== Boxing career ==
Bos was a frequent customer at Jack Dempsey's restaurant and surrounded himself with boxers. In the early 1970s, he, Don Majewski and Malcolm "Flash" Gordon all contributed to, and distributed (usually right in front of fight arenas such as The Felt Forum, Sunnyside Garden, etc.) "Tonight's Boxing Program", a gritty, mimeographed four-sheeter that was chock-full of all sorts of boxing insider info, as well as insight into the night's fight card. In 1978, he focused mainly on boxing and became a boxing matchmaker. Bos became one of the biggest matchmakers in New York and New Jersey during the 1980s. He was instrumental in putting together most of the numerous Atlantic City hotel/casino fight promotions there. In the 1990s, he helped Tyrone Booze, Tracy Harris Patterson and Joey Gamache all win boxing titles. He was the matchmaker responsible for the early career-building fights involving Mike Tyson and Tommy Morrison, and Tyson's late manager, Jimmy Jacobs, once said of Bos (from Peter Heller's Tyson biography, ""Bad Intentions: The Mike Tyson Story"): "There are people who are geniuses in certain areas. Johnny Bos is a genius when it comes to shit." This was meant as a huge compliment, testament to Bos' knack for finding just the right opponents for an up-and-coming fighter.

It was with Joey Gamache that Bos' career took a bad turn; not due to anything on Gamache's part. After a controversial weigh-in at the NYSAC offices in 2000, in which a commission representative actually allowed an overweight Arturo Gatti step briefly on, then off the scale, and then announced a pre-agreed, false weight, Bos raised hell with them. He was told to "Shut the fuck up", and the result was that a Gatti who outweighed Gamache by over 20 pounds, scored a brutal 2nd round knockout, causing Gamache brain-damage and ending his career. Bos and Gamache subsequently filed suit against the New York commission, even winning the case, but not being rewarded any monetary compensation. But as a result of Bos taking on the boxing powers-that-be, he was effectively-banned from booking fighters in the NY/NJ area. He then went to Florida to try and restart his career there, but was only marginally-successful in that small market, and never stopped pining for his beloved Manhattan.

== Death ==
Bos died of congestive heart failure and pneumonia in Florida on May 11, 2013.
