= Roger Bush (minister) =

Australian Methodist Minister

- Born: 1 September 1918; Kent, England
- Died: 30 September 2000 (aged 82); Port Macquarie, New South Wales
- Occupation: Methodist minister
- Known for: Newspaper columnist & Talk back radio host
- Spouse: Glenyce
- Children: Lesley & Peter Bush

Roger Bush OBE (1 September 1918 – 30 September 2000) was a British-born Australian Methodist minister and media personality.

== Early life ==
Bush was born in England and his family migrated to Sydney, Australia, the following year. He was the oldest of a family of four and had two brothers and a sister.

== Family and BHP ==
He met his wife, Glenyce, in Norfolk whilst serving with the Royal Australian Air Force during World War II. After the war, they returned to Sydney and had two children, Peter and Lesley. Bush was employed by BHP at Wollongong before being ordained as a minister.

== Methodist minister ==
He became an early talkback radio minister on Connections, a three-hour talkback program he devised and hosted on 2CH. Bush wrote a column for the Sydney Sun newspaper for 12 years. From the opening of the Sydney Opera House in 1973 he was responsible for the Christmas program of celebrations.

== Retirement ==
In 1989, Bush retired to Port Macquarie.

== Honours ==
- Port Macquarie Airport Memorial – 2001 Air Force Association
- Officer – Order of the British Empire 1981 for service to the community
- Member – Order of the British Empire 1973 for service to the community

== Publications ==
- The Open Line Bedside Book – (Sydney, 1984)
- The Origins of Christmas: Fact, Fiction and Myth – Reed Publishing (Sydney, 1982)
- The Origins of Easter: Fact, Fiction and Myth – Reed Publishing (Sydney, 1982)
- A Bush Christmas – Rigby (Sydney, 1980)
- All the trees were green – Rigby (Adelaide, 1979)
- Prayers for Pagans – Hodder & Stoughton (Sydney, 1968)
