= Irene Bosch =

Venezuelan microbiologist

- Education: Central University of Venezuela; Harvard University
- Occupation: Molecular biologist

Irene Bosch is a Venezuelan molecular biologist and medical researcher. She graduated from the Central University of Venezuela with two doctorates from Harvard University in molecular biology and tropical medicine, with extensive experience in research on dengue, zika and chikungunya.

== Career ==
By 2012, she developed rapid tests to detect these mosquito-borne diseases, creating the rapid test for dengue fever, on sale in Colombia, and the device for zika and chikungunya, which also allows early detection of the diseases.

In 2018, Bosch founded with a group of scientists and Lee Gehrke, a professor at Harvard University and MIT, E25Bio, a company dedicated to making rapid tests for infectious diseases. By 2020, the group created a rapid test for diagnosing virus diseases aimed at helping to contain the spread of COVID-19: the Dart Direct Antigen Rapid Test.
