= Rinus van den Bosch =

Dutch painter

Rinus van den Bosch (January 10, 1938 – 14 April 1996) was a Dutch artist, who worked as sculptor, photographer, installation artist, painter, and draftsman.

== Life and work ==
Born in The Hague, van den Bosch was educated at the Royal Academy of Art, The Hague from 1954 to 1960.

Van den Bosch settled as independent artist in The Hague in 1970. He was lecturer at the Academie voor Beeldende Kunsten St Joost in Breda until 1988. In 1982 he was appointed as teacher at the Willem de Kooning Academy in 1982. In 2009 Museum Boijmans Van Beuningen held a retrospective exhibition of his work.

The artist showed the world and the people in it through line drawings, ranging from the figurative to the abstract, most with poetic titles. In these drawings, created with a sure touch and economy of line, he captured topical events and the atmosphere of The Hague as it was in the 1970s. Simplicity, colour and humour are characteristics of his paintings. Willem Otterspeer wrote in 2009 a biographic essay called Flarden van een stem. At the same time Diederiekje Bok made the book Rinus with contributions by Kees van Kooten, Tommy Wieringa, Willem Otterspeer, A.L. Snijders, Peter Struycken, Dick Matena and Wim Beeren. Rinus van den Bosch was in a relationship with Dutch portrait painter Marike Bok.
