= Peter Bush (businessman) =

Australian company director

- Born: Bulli, New South Wales, Australia
- Education: Newington College; Macquarie University
- Spouse: Adrienne Chartres
- Parent: Roger Bush

Peter Hallam Bush is an Australian business executive. He was previously the chairman of Southern Cross Austereo. He was managing director of McDonald's Australia and a former director of Lion Nathan.

== Early life and family ==
Bush is the son of a Methodist minister and media personality, the Rev Roger Bush, and was born in Bulli, New South Wales. He was educated at Newington College (1964-1970) and Macquarie University. He married Adrienne Chartres on 17 August 1981 and is the father of a daughter and son.

== Business career ==
He has been Chairman and CEO of Schwarzkopf Australasia and has held senior marketing positions with AGB McNair, Unilever, Johnson & Johnson and Arnott's. He was Managing Director of McDonald's Australia Limited from 2005 until retiring in 2010 due to ill health. In December 2011 he was appointed chairman of Nine Entertainment and he resigned in 2013.

== Sport ==
Bush is a past Commodore of the Cruising Yacht Club of Australia and headed the inquiry into the storm ravaged 1998 Sydney to Hobart Yacht Race.
