= Joe Bush (American football) =

American football coach and athletic director

Playing career
- 1962–1965: VMI

Coaching career (HC unless noted)
- 1970–1984: VMI (assistant)
- 1985: Bridgewater
- 1986–1996: Hampden–Sydney

Administrative career (AD unless noted)
- 1986–2010: Hampden–Sydney

Head coaching record
- Overall: 62–56–1

Joe Bush is a retired American football coach and athletic director. He served as the head coach at Bridgewater College in Bridgewater, Virginia for one season in 1985 before moving to Hampden–Sydney College in Hampden Sydney, Virginia where he was the head coach for 11 seasons (1986–1996).

A 1965 graduate of VMI, Bush served as an assistant for his alma mater from 1970 to 1984. After his final season as the head coach at Hamden–Sydney, he served as the school's athletic director until his retirement in 2010.
