= Connie Bush =

Australian Aboriginal health worker

Constance Doreen Bush MBE (1919 – 1997) was an Australian Aboriginal health worker.

Bush was born in 1919 at Borroloola. Her mother, Norah, was a Garrwa woman and her father, Tom Turner, was a mounted police constable. Connie and her mother were separated in 1924, and never saw each other again. Bush was raised at the mission in Groote Eylandt.

A street in Alyangula, Northern Territory, is named in her honour.

Bush was appointed MBE in the 1981 Birthday Honours "for services to Aboriginal women".

In 1990, Bush published several short works, including two autobiographical works, in a special issue of Australian Short Stories on Aboriginal Short Stories, edited by Bruce Pascoe. The volume was dedicated to Bush and to Maureen Watson.
