= Gijs Bosch Reitz =

Dutch painter

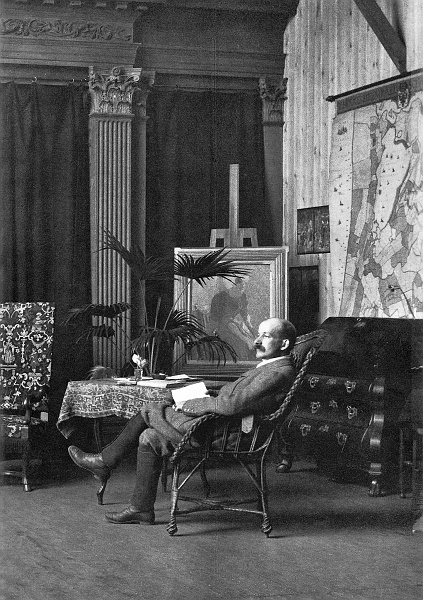
- Born: February 20, 1860; Amsterdam, Netherlands
- Died: April 9, 1938 (aged 78); Amsterdam, Netherlands
- Occupation: Painter

Sigisbert Chrétien Bosch Reitz, known as Gijs (1860-1938) was a Dutch painter in the Impressionist and Symbolist styles. He was also associated with the Laren School.

== Biography ==
Bosch Reitz was born to a wealthy family and began his working career as a merchant. At the age of twenty-three, he decided to become an artist instead. After briefly attending the Quellinusschool, in Amsterdam, he went to Munich, where he took various drawing and painting courses, then finished his training at the Académie Julian in Paris, under the direction of William-Adolphe Bouguereau.

Upon his return, he settled in Katwijk aan Zee, but left after a short time to participate in the Exposition Universelle (1889), then went to England, where he lived in Runswick Bay and St. Ives before returning to Amsterdam.

He could not settle down, however, moving to the Gooi in 1892, first in Eemnes, then Laren. Between each move, he travelled; to France, the United States and Japan, where he made a detailed study of Japanese art. This won him an international reputation and, from 1915 to 1927, he was a consultant on "Far Eastern Art" for the Metropolitan Museum in New York. He also managed a collection of Chinese porcelain at the Louvre.

He produced relatively few paintings because he worked slowly, paid great attention to detail and often strove hard to achieve a tapestry-like effect. Even his simplest, decorative-style works were the result of lengthy, concentrated effort. Richard Roland Holst and Ferdinand Hart Nibbrig were good friends, but he generally remained aloof from the other artists at Laren and their social or professional affairs.

He died in an accident involving one of the steam-powered trolleys that ran between Laren and Amsterdam; known as the "Gooische Moordenaar" (The Killers of Gooi) due to the number of fatal accidents they caused.

== Gallery ==
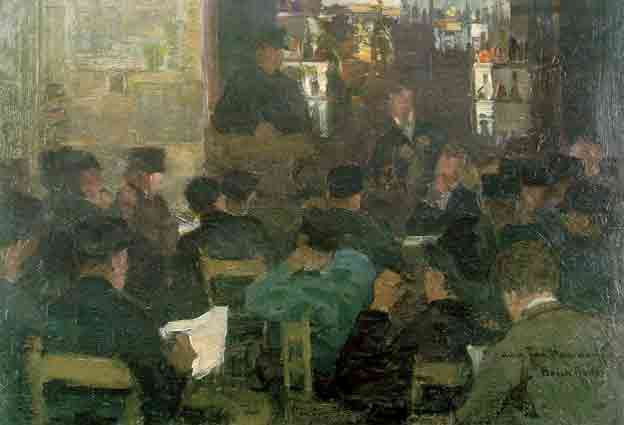
In Jan Hamdorff's Pub

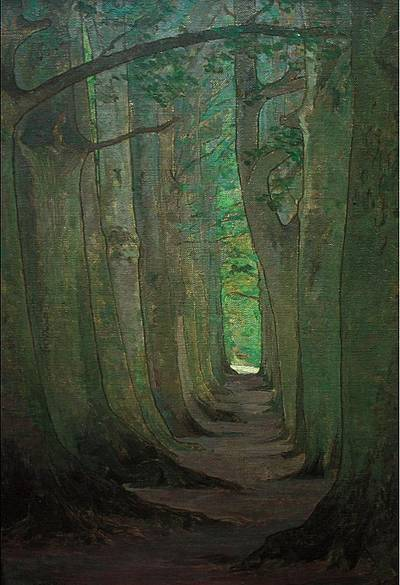
Forest Lane

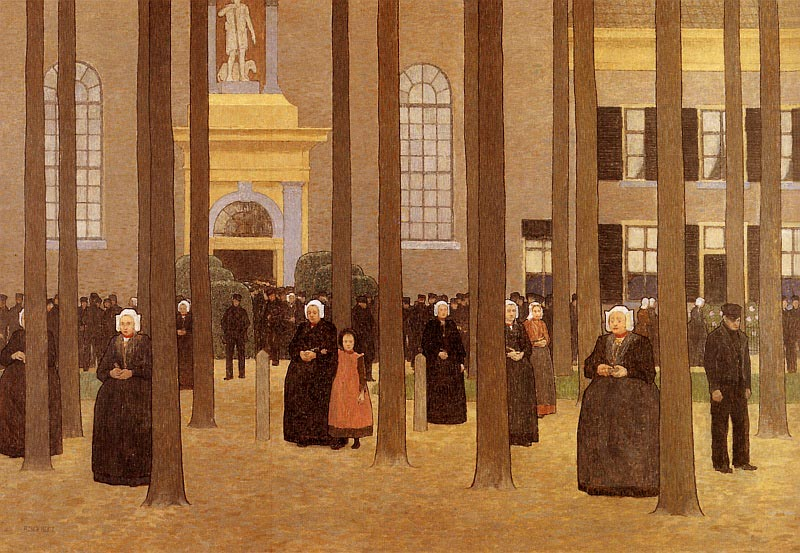
Saint John's Procession

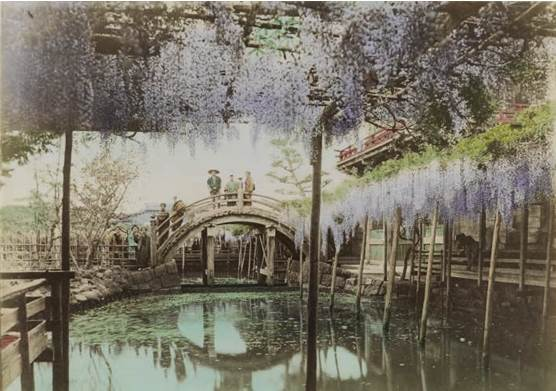
Blooming Wisteria at
the Shiba Temple

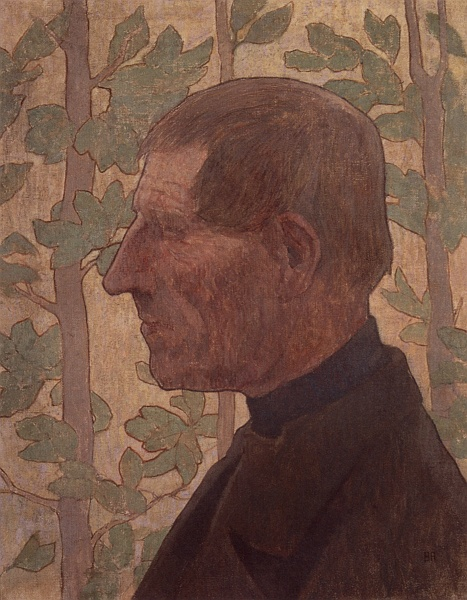
Portrait of Steffen Calis

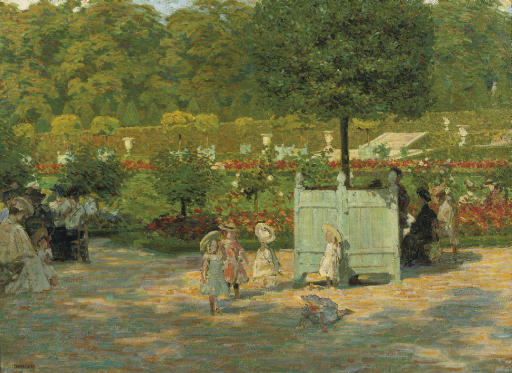
Latrine on the Lawn at Versailles
