= Maura Bosch =

American composer

Marjorie Ann Hess a.k.a. Maura Bosch (born 1956) is an American composer. She was born in Reading, Pennsylvania, and studied at the Hartt College of Music where she received a Bachelor of Music degree in 1978, and at Princeton University where she received a Master of Fine Arts degree in 1982 and a Ph.D. in 2008, after studying with Alexander Lepak, Edward T. Cone, Milton Babbitt and Peter Westergaard.

== Career ==
She married composer Jeffrey Brooks and lived for a while in Bath, England, where Brooks was composer-in-residence at Bath College. After returning to the United States, the couple settled in Minneapolis. She co-founded and ran Corn Palace Productions, a Minneapolis music theatre company, from 1990 through 1997. The company produced dozens of new works, including three of her own operas. One of them was based on a poem by James Merrill, with whom she collaborated in writing the libretto. She also founded and played with the ensemble Blackstone Bosch from 1997 until 2000.

In 2007 Maura Bosch was in residence with the Tubman Family Alliance, a network of shelters for abused women, to compose a work based on their experiences.

In 2009, Maura Bosch composed and wrote the libretto for her fourth opera, Art and Desire, about a fictional meeting between Lee Krasner and Clement Greenberg twenty years after the death of Krasner's husband, Jackson Pollock.

== Works ==
Bosch has composed works in a variety of genres including choral, vocal and instrumental works and opera. Selected compositions include:

- The Disappearance of Luisa Porto, opera (1989)
- Mirabell’s Book of Numbers, opera (1991)
- The Damnation of Felicity, opera (1994)
- 3 Hymns (1995)
- My Purity (1995)
- Zelda Songs (1997)
- Bronte Songs (1996)
- The Oxen (1993)
- Santuario (1992) for orchestra
- About the Night (1993) for string quartet
- The Turning, cantata (2007)
- Art and Desire, opera (2009)

Bosch has published a text:

- Everyone can compose music (2008) Princeton University
