= Jan Bosch =

Dutch computer scientist (born 1967)

Jan Bosch (born 1967) is a Dutch computer scientist, Professor of Software Engineering at the Eindhoven University of Technology and at Chalmers University of Technology, and IT consultant, particularly known for his work on software architecture.

== Biography ==
Bosch received his MSc in computer science in 1991 from the University of Twente, and in 1995 his PhD degree in computer science from Lund University.

In 1994 Bosch got appointed Professor of Software Engineering at the Blekinge Institute of Technology, and from 2000 till 2020 he was affiliated with the University of Groningen, where he became Professor of Software Engineering. Since 2011 he is also Professor of Software Engineering at Chalmers University of Technology. Since 2020 he is affiliated with Eindhoven University of Technology

In 2004 Bosch became also Vice President and the Head of Laboratory at the Nokia Research Center, and from 2007 to 2011 he Vice President Engineering Process at Intuit. In 2011 he co-founded the consultancy firm Boschonian AB, where he is partner.

== Selected publications ==
- Bosch, Jan. Design and use of software architectures: adopting and evolving a product-line approach. Pearson Education, 2000.
- Bosch, Jan. Speed, Data, and Ecosystems: Excelling in a Software-Driven World., CRC Press 2016.

Articles, a selection:

- Aksit, M., Wakita, K., Bosch, J., Bergmans, L., & Yonezawa, A. (1994). "Abstracting object interactions using composition filters." In Object-Based Distributed Programming (pp. 152-184). Springer Berlin Heidelberg.
- Van Gurp, Jilles, Jan Bosch, and Mikael Svahnberg. "On the notion of variability in software product lines." Software Architecture, 2001. Proceedings. Working IEEE/IFIP Conference on. IEEE, 2001.
- Bengtsson, P., Lassing, N., Bosch, J., & van Vliet, H. (2004). Architecture-level modifiability analysis (ALMA). Journal of Systems and Software, 69(1), 129-147.
- Svahnberg, Mikael, Jilles Van Gurp, and Jan Bosch. "A taxonomy of variability realization techniques." Software: Practice and Experience 35.8 (2005): 705-754.
- Hartmann, H., Trew, T., Bosch, J., 2012. The changing industry structure of software development for consumer electronics and its consequences for software architectures. Journal of Systems and Software 85, 178–192. doi:10.1016/j.jss.2011.08.007.

== Investments ==
Jan Bosch is also an angel investor in several Scandinavian companies including Remente and Fidesmo in Sweden, and Kosli in Norway.
