= A. S. Bush =

American politician

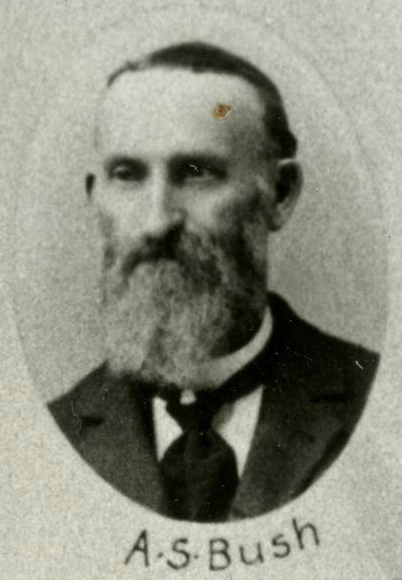
- Bush in 1895

Member of the Washington House of Representatives for the 25th district
- In office 1893–1899

Personal details
- Born: December 24, 1837 Yates County, New York, United States
- Died: July 2, 1917 (aged 79) Bay Center, Washington, United States
- Party: Republican; Silver Republican

Anderson S. Bush (December 24, 1837 – July 2, 1917) was an American politician in the state of Washington. He served in the Washington House of Representatives from 1893 to 1899.
