= George Henry Bosch =

George Henry Bosch (18 February 1861 – 30 August 1934) was an Australian merchant and philanthropist. Bosch was born at Osborne's Flat, near Beechworth, Victoria, the son of George Bosch, a miner from Bavaria, and his wife Emily, née Spann, of Hamburg.
