= Robert Bush =

Robert or Bob Bush may refer to:

- Robert Edwin Bush (1855–1939), Australian settler and cricketer
- Robert Eugene Bush (1926–2005), American sailor, Medal of Honor recipient
- Robert P. Bush (1842–1923), American physician, soldier and politician
- Robert J. Bush (born 1978), English criminal, see Legacy Independent Funeral Directors scandal
- Robert Bush (cyclist) (born 1990), American cyclist
- Robert Bush (Surrey cricketer) (1839–1874), English cricketer
- Robert A. Baruch Bush (born 1948), American legal scholar
