= Joseph Janssen =

Pakistan activist

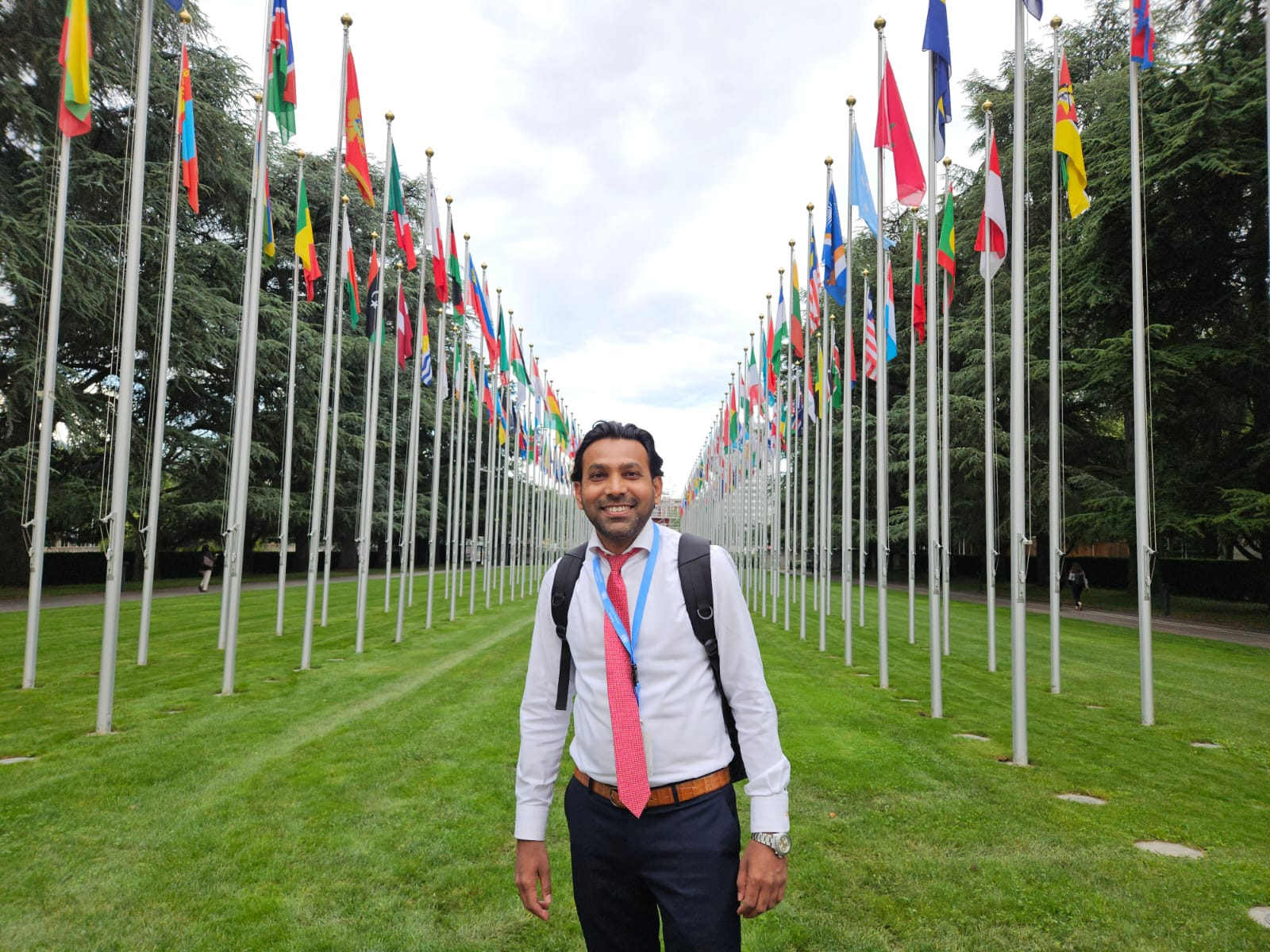
- Born: October 15, 1986 (age 39); Punjab, Pakistan
- Occupations: Human rights defender, minority rights activist
- Organization: Voice for Justice (chairperson)
- Known for: Shafqat Emmanuel and Shagufta Kausar blasphemy case
- Spouse: Mirjam Bos (m. 2018)
- Children: 2
- Awards: Shabbaz Bhatti Award

Joseph Janssen (born October 15, 1986) is a Pakistani minority rights activist, recognized for his efforts in supporting persecuted Christians, particularly those accused of blasphemy, individuals trapped in debt slavery, and young girls subjected to forced marriages and exploitation.

== Family crisis and advocacy ==
In 2014, his sister, Shagufta Kausar, and her husband, Shafqat Emmanuel, were falsely accused of blasphemy, leading to their sentencing to death. The couple, who were illiterate and unable to send the allegedly blasphemous text message, became the subject of a high-profile case. Joseph received threats from the police and overheard his brother-in-law being beaten.

Fearing for his safety, Joseph sought asylum in Spain in 2014, where he joined the Neocatechumenal Way, a Catholic Christian movement focused on the spiritual formation of adults. From there, he began to advocate for his sister’s case and raised international awareness about the persecution of Christians in Pakistan. The case gained support from various Christian organizations and human rights defenders, including Pakistani lawyer Saif-Ul-Malook, who worked on their behalf.

On June 3, 2021, the Lahore High Court overturned their convictions due to a lack of evidence, and the couple was acquitted. Following their acquittal, the couple was granted asylum in a European country due to safety concerns in Pakistan.

== Current work and recognition ==
Joseph and his wife are actively involved with the Jubilee Campaign, a non-profit organization dedicated to defending the rights of persecuted Christians and promoting religious freedom worldwide. In 2020, Joseph founded the non-profit organization named Voice for Justice, which focuses on advocating for religious freedom and the protection of Christians, especially in Pakistan.

Joseph remains a prominent advocate for religious freedom, with a particular emphasis on supporting individuals imprisoned due to their faith, those trapped in debt bondage, and young girls trapped into marriage or sex trafficking.

He contributed to the reports titled "Stolen Girls" and "Conversion without Consent," documenting the abductions, forced conversions, and forced marriages of Christian girls and women in Pakistan, which was jointly produced by Voice for Justice and Jubilee Campaign.

In July 2023, Jansen condemned the rape of a seven-year-old Christian girl in Sahiwal, Pakistan. He stated that minority girls are disproportionately targeted due to systemic bias, alleging that police and officials in Pakistan often show partiality towards the majority community, which hinders justice for victims.

In August 2023, Jansen criticized the bill to introduce amendment to Section 298-A of the Pakistan Penal Code for increasing punishments, warning it could lead to misuse and fabricated accusations. He also condemned the inclusion of Section 7 of the Anti-Terrorism Act with Section 295-C of the Pakistan Penal Code, highlighting its potential to fuel mob justice and further endanger the accused, often under the influence of religio-political groups.

== Awards ==
In 2023, Joseph received the Shahbaz Bhatti Award in Kushpur, Pakistan, in recognition of his dedication to the mission of the late Shahbaz Bhatti, a prominent Pakistani politician and advocate for minority rights. Joseph continues to carry forward Bhatti's legacy, committing to be a voice for the voiceless and ensuring that the injustices his family faced are not repeated.

== See also ==
- Neocatechumenal Way
- List of Christian human rights non-governmental organisations
