= John Bush (provincial soldier) =

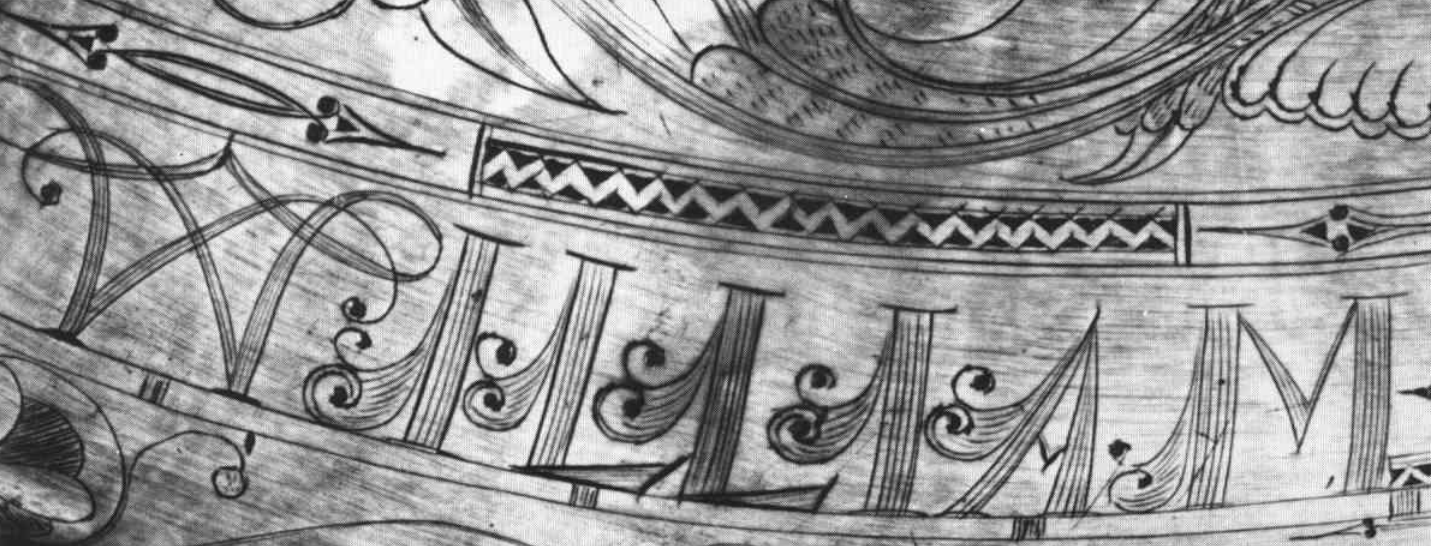
This is the carved powder horn by carver John Bush

John Bush was an African provincial soldier with the Massachusetts militia who fought on the side of Britain during the French and Indian Wars in North America. He is known for his carving of powder horns of the time. One of his 1756 horns has been part of a travelling exhibition throughout Canada and US. The quality of his carving and use of calligraphy has been called "superb". Bush's carving style and decorative embellishments were used in the Lake George School during the French and Indian War. Other powder horn carvers adopted Bush's engraving style. They are known as the Sekrig-Page carver, the I.W. carver, and the Memento Mori carver. Bush is considered a founder of American folk art. He was captured during the battle and fall of Fort William Henry August 9, 1757. What happened after this is not known. John Bush's father, George Bush, moved to Massachusetts Bay during the eighteenth century. John Bush's mother is unknown. George was a farmer in North Parish of Shrewsbury (now Boyleston). George died at the age of eighty years old in 1767. John had three brothers who also fought with the Massachusetts militia during the war. They were George Bush, who died on September 25, 1755, and Joseph Bush, who died on April 8, 1756.
