= Stephen Bush (disambiguation) =

Stephen Bush is a British journalist.

Stephen Bush may also refer to:

- Stephen Bush (artist), contemporary Australian artist, winner of the Arthur Guy Memorial Painting Prize in 2007
- Stephen J. Bush, Welsh actor
