= Chris Bush =

Chris Bush may refer to:

- Chris Bush (playwright) (born 1986), British playwright and artistic director of White Rose Theatre
- Chris Bush (Australian soccer) (born 1992), Australian football (soccer) player for Dapto Dandaloo Fury
- Chris Bush (American football) (born 1981), American and Canadian football player
- Chris Bush (English footballer) (born 1992), English footballer for Bromley
- Chris Bush (boat racer), 1988 winner of the Formula 1 Powerboat World Grand Prix
