= Ramon Bosc =

Catalan priest and writer

Ramon Bosc (1300s in Reus – 1416) was a Catalan priest and writer in Latin.

He is known for the inventory of his goods and manuscripts, which are found at the Priory of Reus, according to Juan Corminas.

== Works ==
- Martiniana super cronicis disgestis romanorum.
