= Tamara Bush =

American biomechanical engineer

Tamara Reid Bush
- Education: Michigan State University
- Awards: ASME Fellow (2016); ASB Founders' Award (2020); AIMBE Fellow (2021); ASME Savio L-Y. Woo Translational Biomechanics Medal (2023)
- Engineering career
- Discipline: Biomechanical engineering
- Institutions: Michigan State University

Tamara Reid Bush is an American biomechanical engineer whose research includes the mechanics of seated postures and their effects on the soft tissues of the body, mobility devices for disabled people, and the biomechanics of the thumb. She is a professor of mechanical engineering at Michigan State University and associate dean for inclusion and diversity in the Michigan State University College of Engineering.

== Education and career ==
Bush earned a bachelor's degree in mechanical engineering, a master's degree in mechanics, and a Ph.D. in experimental mechanics, all from Michigan State University. She joined the Michigan State faculty in 2009.

== Recognition ==
Bush was elected as an ASME Fellow in 2016. She was elected to the 2021 class of the AIMBE College of Fellows for her contributions to translating fundamental tissue biomechanics to rehabilitation engineering applications and her support of women in STEM.

She received the 2020 Founders' Award of the American Society of Biomechanics, given in recognition of scientific accomplishment in biomechanics and excellence in mentoring. She received the Savio L-Y. Woo Translational Biomechanics Medal of the ASME in 2023 for her work in translational biomechanics research, including thumb biomechanics and wheelchair seating with clinical applications.
