= Lex Bos =

Dutch field hockey player

Jacobus Gerardus Maria Alexander ("Lex") Bos (born 22 September 1957 in Tilburg) is a former field hockey goalkeeper from the Netherlands, who was a member of the Dutch National Team that finished sixth in the 1984 Summer Olympics in Los Angeles. He was the stand-in for first choice Pierre Hermans. Bos earned a total number of 37 caps, in the years 1982–1986. He retired from international competition after the 1986 Men's Hockey World Cup in London.
