= Joe Bush (organ grinder) =

American organ grinder

Joe Bush (c. 1941 – April 7, 2023) was an organ grinder based in Cherry Hill, New Jersey.

Bush began his organ-grinding career in 1975. According to the Los Angeles Times, "Now, with his 65th birthday approaching, Bush is the only organ grinder left in the New York area. He is barrel-chested and mustachioed. He wears red pants. On his shoulder sits George’s replacement, George II, reaching out for dollar bills with the tapered fingers of a tiny old man."

He performed with a capuchin monkey named Oscar.

Joe died April 7, 2023. The following excerpt from his obituary describes his surviving relatives:

"Joe Bush of Cherry Hill, NJ passed away on April 7th 2023, at the age of 81, and 6 months after the passing of his late wife Sally A. Wolk. He is survived by his daughter, Lisa Bush and one grandson, and the late Anthony S. Bush, with 4 grandchildren and 3 great-grandchildren. He is survived by his sister Beverly Coburn, brother Myron Smith and the late Robert Smith."
