= Pieter van den Bosch (painter) =

Dutch Golden Age painter

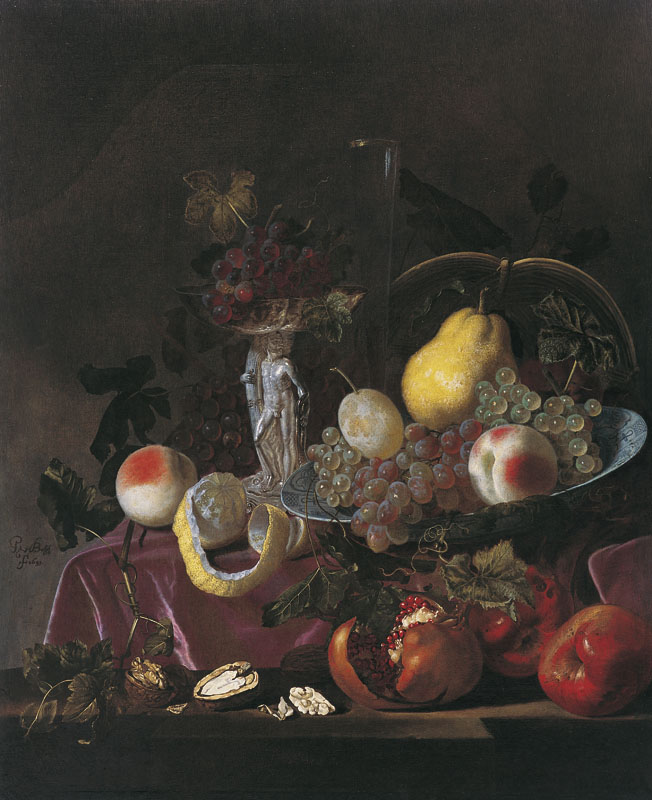
Still life

Paulus, or Pieter van den Bosch (c. 1613 – c. 1673), was a Dutch Golden Age painter.

== Biography ==
He was born in Amsterdam and in October 1650 declared that he was 37 years old. He is known for genre works and fruit and flower still lifes, and moved to London in December 1663 where he died before 1683.

He is not to be confused with the earlier Pieter van den Bosch (1604–1649) of Leiden.
