= Tommy Bush =

American actor

Thomas Curtis Bush (February 6, 1928 – February 4, 2003) was an American actor. He was born in Orange County, California.

He frequently worked with Sam Peckinpah, appearing in The Getaway, The Killer Elite and Convoy. Other films he appeared in include Ed Wood, Cobb, Crimson Tide, Mars Attacks!, Con Air, Rush Hour and Dr. Dolittle 2. He appeared in such TV series as T.J. Hooker, Hart To Hart and Simon & Simon. He played Deputy Sturgess on Bret Maverick. He died on February 4, 2003, in Los Angeles, California, at age 74.

== Partial filmography ==
- The Getaway (1972) - Cowboy's Helper
- The Killer Elite (1975) - Sam the Mechanic
- Convoy (1978) - Chief Stacey Love
- Indecent Proposal (1993) - David's Father
- Ed Wood (1994) - Stage Manager
- Cobb (1994) - Rogers Hornsby
- Crimson Tide (1995) - Admiral Williams
- A Family Thing (1996) - Old Man
- Mars Attacks! (1996) - Hillbilly
- Con Air (1997) - Fresno Sheriff Ted Grasso
- Rush Hour (1998) - Bomb Practice Sergeant
- Crime and Punishment in Suburbia (2000) - Chief Judson
- Dr. Dolittle 2 (2001) - Farmer (final film role)
