= Miguel Jaume y Bosch =

Spanish painter (1844–1900)

- Born: Miguel Jaume y Bosch; 1844; Palma de Mallorca, Spain
- Died: 18 May 1900 (aged 55–56); Montevideo, Uruguay
- Education: Academia de Bellas Artes, Palma de Mallorca
- Known for: Painting, Portraits, Urban scenes
- Notable work: Portraits of Montevideo residents, 19th-century cityscapes
- Style: Realism
- Spouse: Maria Teresa Bernat

Miguel Jaume y Bosch (1844–1900) was a Spanish painter who lived most of his life in Montevideo, Uruguay.

== Biography ==
He was born in 1844 in Palma de Mallorca, Spain, where he studied at the Academia de Bellas Artes. In 1871, Jaume arrived in Montevideo, where he lived until his death on 18 May 1900. He was married to Maria Teresa Bernat. In Uruguay, he opened an art studio where he became the teacher of several local painters, among them Pedro Blanes Viale.

In Montevideo, he acted as the secretary of Jose Pedro Varela, who was the author of the 1877 Law Of Common Education. In addition, he was the president of a local institution organized to help jobless immigrants from the Balearic Islands.

Many of his paintings are portraits of people from Montevideo and show the people and the streets in the second part of 19th century.
