= Christian Busch (management scientist) =

German management scientist

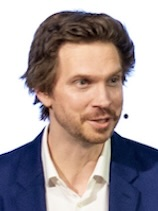
- Born: 1984 (age 41–42); Bergisch Gladbach
- Education: London School of Economics (MSc 2009, PhD 2014)
- Scientific career
- Fields: Innovation; Serendipity; Leadership and strategy-making under uncertainty
- Workplaces: University of Southern California (2023–present); London School of Economics (2015–present); New York University (2019–2023)

Christian Busch (born 1984 in Bergisch Gladbach) is a management scientist, author and public speaker recognized for his work on serendipity, innovation, and purpose-driven leadership. He is an associate professor of clinical management and organization at the University of Southern California (USC) Marshall School of Business and an affiliate researcher at the London School of Economics.

== Education ==
Busch earned a Bachelor of Business Administration (B.B.A.) from Furtwangen University, and a Bachelor of Arts (B.A.) in Politics and Organization at the University of Hagen. He received his MSc and PhD degrees in management at the London School of Economics.

== Career and awards ==
Busch serves as an Associate Professor of Clinical Management and Organization at the USC Marshall School of Business. Previously, he taught at the London School of Economics (LSE) and New York University (NYU), where he directed the Center for Global Affairs’ Global Economy Program. He co-founded the organizations Leaders on Purpose and Sandbox Network, and served as co-director of LSE's Innovation Lab.

He is a member of the Expert Forum of the World Economic Forum, a Fellow of the Royal Society of Arts, among CAPITAL's ‘Top 40 under 40’ and on the Thinkers50 Radar list of management thinkers ‘most likely to shape the future’.

Busch is also a ‘Subject Matter Expert’ of the Academy of Management.

== Research ==
Busch’s research interests include:

- Serendipity
- Leadership and strategy-making under uncertainty
- Social entrepreneurship and social innovation
- High-growth entrepreneurship and innovation
- Emerging markets

He has received multiple ‘Best Paper Awards’ from the Academy of Management, as well as the Masini Award for Innovative Scholarship. He serves on the Editorial Review Board of the Academy of Management Perspectives and is a guest editor at the Strategic Management Journal for a special issue on ‘Serendipity, Chance, and Luck in Management and Strategy’.

Busch has published several scientific papers on serendipity, conceptualizing it as "active luck"—the notion of actively making surprising and valuable discoveries. He identifies three key elements of serendipity that help distinguish it from related concepts: agency, surprise and value, and presents a multi-level model involving chance triggers, associations (creating new connections) and ‘materialization’ (realizing a specific possibility). Busch’s theory suggests that social actors have agency in creating serendipity: Like training ‘hard skills’ related to finance or engineering, it is possible to train serendipity-related skills such as alertness. In 2025, the Journal of Management Studies awarded Busch its 2024 Best Paper Award for "Towards a Theory of Serendipity: A Systematic Review and Conceptualization".

Busch's research is widely used in educational and professional development programs, including by the American Psychological Association and Harvard Business Review's Harvard ManageMentor.

He has delivered multiple TED and TEDx Talks on topics such as luck, serendipity, innovation, and purpose-driven leadership An additional focus of his work has been on zemblanity.

=== Works (selected) ===
- Busch, C. 2024. Towards a theory of serendipity: A systematic review and conceptualization. Journal of Management Studies, 61(3): 1110–1151.
- Busch, C., & Mudida, R. 2024. Asserting and transcending ethnic homophily: How entrepreneurs develop social ties in socially contested environments to access resources and opportunities. Strategic Entrepreneurship Journal, 18: 229–257.
- Busch, C., & Grimes, M. 2023. Serendipity in entrepreneurship, strategy, and innovation. In: Copeland, S., Ross, W. & Sand, M. (Eds.), Serendipity Science: 69–100. London: Springer Nature.
- Busch, C., & Barkema, H.G. 2022. Planned luck: How incubators can facilitate serendipity for nascent entrepreneurs through fostering network embeddedness. Entrepreneurship Theory & Practice, 46(4): 884–919.
- Busch, C., & Hehenberger, L. 2022. How to evaluate the impact of corporate purpose. MIT Sloan Management Review, Fall Issue.
- Busch, C., & Barkema, H.G. 2021. From necessity to opportunity: Scaling bricolage in resource-constrained environments. Strategic Management Journal, 42: 741–773.
- Busch, C. 2020. The Serendipity Mindset. New York: Penguin Random House.
- Busch, C. 2020. Toward an enlightened form of capitalism: The changing role of private organizations in the context of global affairs. In: * Ankersen, C., & Sidhu, W.P.S. (Eds.), The Future of Global Affairs: 97–122. New York: Palgrave Macmillan.
- Busch, C. 2020. How to create your own career luck. Harvard Business Review Digital Articles (24 August 2020).
- Busch, C., & Barkema, H.G. 2019. Social entrepreneurs as network orchestrators: In: George, G., Tracey, P., Baker, T. & Havovi, J. (Eds.), Handbook of Inclusive Innovation: 464–486. London: Edward Elgar Publishing.

== Author activity ==
He is the author of "The Serendipity Mindset"—internationally published as "Connect the Dots", and in German as "Erfolgsfaktor Zufall"—which became a "Der Spiegel" business book bestseller and was selected by Blinkist as one of the ‘Top 100 Innovation Books. As of August 2024, it has been translated into 12 languages. This book was a finalist for the 2018 Financial Times / McKinsey Bracken Bower Prize for "best business book proposal of the year by a young writer".

He contributes columns to Psychology Today as well as Wirtschaftswoche.

== Private ==
Busch is German, married to an US-American woman and has one daughter.
