= Robert Bosch Jr. =

German businessman (1928-2004)

- Born: 29 January 1928; Stuttgart
- Died: 2 August 2004 (aged 76); Gerlingen
- Occupation: Businessman

Robert Bosch Jr. (29 January 1928 in Stuttgart – 2 August 2004 in Gerlingen) was the son of Robert Bosch and owned together with his sister, Eva Madelung, 8% of Robert Bosch GmbH.

He studied electrical engineering in Stuttgart. He was married to Irmgard von Graevenitz. From 1971 to 1978 he was a member of the supervisory board.
