= Busk =

Busk may refer to:

- Busk (corsetry), the rigid element of a corset placed at the center front
- Busking, or street performance

== Places ==
- Busk, Cumbria, a hamlet in Cumbria, England
- Busk, Greater Manchester, a locality in Greater Manchester, England
- Busk, Ukraine, a city in Lviv Oblast, Ukraine
- Busk Raion, a former raion in Lviv Oblast, Ukraine, containing the city

== Other ==
- Busk (surname)
- Busk, or Green Corn Ceremony, a ceremony of the Muscogee people
- BUSK, Bradley Urban Survival Kit
