= Bösch =

Bösch is a surname. Notable people with the name include:

- Beat Bösch (born 1971), Swiss athlete
- Fabian Bösch (born 1997), Swiss freestyle skier
- Fritz Bösch, Swiss rower
- Herbert Bösch (born 1954), Austrian politician
- Tamara Bösch (born 1989), Austrian handballer

== See also ==
- Boesch, Bösch, Bosch, Busch, Busche, Bush, Busk, Van den Bos, Van den Bosch, Van den Bossche, Von dem Busche
