= Boesch =

Boesch is a surname. Notable people with the name include:

- Brennan Boesch (born 1985), American professional baseball player
- Christian Boesch (born 1941), Austrian operatic baritone
- Christophe Boesch (1951–2024), Swiss-French primatologist
- Florian Boesch (born 1971), Austrian bass-baritone
- Garth Boesch (1920–1998), Canadian professional hockey player
- Paul Boesch (1912–1989), American professional wrestling promoter
- Rudy Boesch (1928–2019), American retired Navy SEAL and reality show contestant
- Ruthilde Boesch (1918–2012), Austrian soprano

== See also ==
- Boesch, Bösch, Bosch, Busch, Busche, Bush, Busk, Van den Bos, Van den Bosch, Van den Bossche
Documentation

Purpose: To avoid content forks in "See also" sections
