= Busche =

Busche is a German surname. Notable people with the surname include:

- Elizabeth Busche (1992–2012), American curler
- F. Enzio Busche (1930–2020), German Mormon missionary
- Heinz Busche (born 1951), West German bobsledder
- Matthew Busche (born 1985), American cyclist

== See also ==
- Hermann von dem Busche (1468–1534), German writer
- Boesch, Bösch, Bosch, Busch, Busche, Bush, Busk, Van den Bos, Van den Bosch, Van den Bossche
