= Van den Bos =

Van den Bos is a Dutch toponymic surname meaning "from the forest".

- Alida van den Bos (1902–2003), Dutch gymnast
- Bob van den Bos (born 1947), Dutch politician
- Conny Vandenbos (1937–2002), Dutch pop singer
- Jasper van den Bos (1634–1656), Dutch painter
- Jip van den Bos (born 1996), Dutch racing cyclist
- Matthijs van den Bos (born 1969), Dutch scholar of Iranian Sufism and European Shi'ism
- Michiel van den Bos (born 1975), Dutch video game musician
- Paul van den Bos (born 1940), Dutch photographer and cinematographer
- Pieter Vanden Bos (born 1961), Canadian football offensive lineman
- Ricardo van den Bos (born 1984), Dutch kickboxer
- Willem Hendrik van den Bos (1886–1974), Dutch-South African astronomer

== See also ==
- 1663 van den Bos, main belt asteroid named after the astronomer
- Van den Bos (crater), small lunar crater named after the astronomer
- Boesch, Bösch, Bosch, Busch, Busche, Bush, Busk, Van den Bos, Van den Bosch, Van den Bossche, Von dem Busche
