= Vandenbussche =

Vandenbussche is a surname. Notable people with the surname include:

- Bram Vandenbussche (born 1981), Belgian footballer
- Brian Vandenbussche (born 1981), Belgian footballer
- Hanna Vandenbussche (born 1987), Belgian athlete
- Jordi van den Bussche (also known as Kwebbelkop), Dutch YouTuber
- Ryan VandenBussche (born 1973), Canadian ice hockey player
