= Meryem =

- Pronunciation: Turkish: [mæɾˈjæm]
- Gender: Feminine
- Language: Turkish

Origin
- Origin: Miriam
- Meaning: Mary

Other names
- Related names: Maryam; Miriam; Miryam; Myriam; Merjeme; Maria; Marija; Mariah; Mary; Marie

Meryem is a feminine Turkish given name. It is the Turkish form of Maryam, and is the name used in Turkey to refer to Mary, the mother of Jesus.

Meriem is another variant form, found as a given name and surname of North African origin.

== Given name ==
- Meryem Aboulouafa (born 1988), Moroccan singer-songwriter
- Meryem Akda (born 1992), Kenyan-Turkish long-distance runner
- Meryem Alaoui (born 1975), Moroccan author
- Meryem Altun (1976–2002), Turkish prisoner
- Meryem Bekmez (born 2000), Turkish race walker
- Meryem Benm'Barek-Aloïsi (born 1984), Moroccan film director and screenwriter
- Meryem Boz (born 1988), Turkish volleyball player
- Meryem Cennet Çal (born 2000), German-Turkish women's footballer
- Meryem Betül Çavdar (born 2000), Turkish para taekwondo practitioner
- Meryem En-Nourhi (born 1990), Moroccan Paralympic athlete
- Meryem Erdoğan (born 1990), Ethiopian-born Turkish long-distance runner
- Meryem Hajri (born 1994), Moroccan footballer
- Meryem Koç (born 1996), Turkish footballer
- Meryem Küçükbirinci (born 2004), Turkish footballer
- Meryem Özyumşak (born 1979), Turkish footballer
- Meryem Tan (born 1999), Turkish wheelchair basketball player
- Meryem Uslu (born 1987), German kickboxer
- Meryem Uzerli (born 1983), German-Turkish actress
- Meryem Yamak (born 1962), Turkish footballer
- Princess Lalla Meryem of Morocco (born 1962)

Meriem

- Meriem Beldi (born 1973), Algerian musician
- Meriem Belmihoub (1935–2021), Algerian independence fighter, lawyer, and feminist
- Meriem Benmouloud (born 1980), Algerian politician
- Meriem Bennani (born 1988), Moroccan 3D animation and video artist based in New York
- Meriem Bidani (born 1972), Moroccan taekwondo practitioner
- Meriem Bjaoui (born 1996), Tunisian judoka
- Meriem Bouderbala (born 1960), Tunisian plastic artist
- Meriem Fekkaï (1889–1961), Algerian musician
- Meriem Ben Mami (born 1980), Tunisian actress
- Meriem Mebarki (born 2003), Algerian fencer
- Meriem Moussa (born 1988), Algerian judoka
- Meriem Oukbir (born 1991), Algerian actress
- Meriem Sassi (born 1991), Tunisian footballer
- Meriem Wangari (born 1979), Kenyan long-distance runner

== Surname ==
- Camel Meriem (born 1979), French footballer

== Fictional characters ==
- Meryem, protagonist of Ethos, a Turkish drama television series
- Meryem, character in Hunter × Hunter, a Japanese manga series

== See also ==
- Maryam (name), including Mariam, Mariyam, Marriyum, Myriem
- Miriam (given name), including Meriam, Mirriam, Miryam, Myriam
- Mirjam, including Mirijam
