= Miriam (given name) =

Female given name

Miriam, Miryam
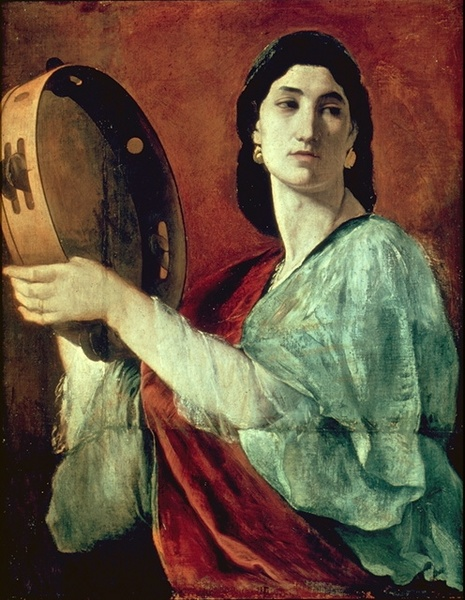
- Miriam the prophetess (Anselm Feuerbach 1862)
- Gender: female

Origin
- Origin: Hebrew (Egyptian)
- Meaning: unknown; various
- Region of origin: Levant

Other names
- Nicknames: Mimi, Miri, Mim, Mir
- Related names: Maria, Mariam, Mary, Maryam, Meryem

Miriam (Hebrew: מִרְיָם, Modern: Mīryam, Tiberian: Mīryām) is a feminine given name recorded in Biblical Hebrew in the Book of Exodus as the name of the sister of Moses, the prophetess Miriam.

Spelling variants include French Myriam, German Mirjam, Mirijam; hypocoristic forms include Mira, Miri and Mimi (commonly given in Israel).

The name's etymology is unclear. Since many Levite names are of Egyptian origin, the name could come from the Egyptian mr "love", as in the Egyptian names mry.t-jmn (Merit-Amun) "beloved of Amun" and mry.t-rꜥ (Merytre) "beloved of Ra".

An older Grecian pronunciation of this name, Maryām (Μαριάμ), is found in the Greek Old Testament (3rd century BCE) and in the New Testament manuscripts as the name of several women, including Mary, mother of Jesus and Mary Magdalene. Variants of this name include Greek and Latin Maria, whence French Marie and English Mary.

"Miriam" is a common female name in countries that speak English, French, Spanish, Portuguese, German and Dutch as well as among Ashkenazi Jews. It is also fairly common in Scandinavian countries, Italy, Romania, Hungary, Poland, the Czech Republic, Slovakia, Slovenia and Croatia.

== Variant Maryam ==
Mary, mother of the Jesus of the New Testament, bore a Judeo-Aramaic variant of this name, Maryām (מרים). In the New Testament of the Bible, written in Greek, her name is transliterated Mariam (Μαριάμ) or Maria. Several other women in the New Testament, including St. Mary Magdalene, are called by the same name.

In antiquity, it was variously etymologized as "rebellion", "bitter sea", "strong waters", "exalted one", "ruling one", "wished for child", or "beautiful".

St. Jerome (writing c. 390), following Eusebius of Caesarea, translates the name as "drop of the sea" (stilla maris in Latin), from Hebrew מר mar "drop" (cf. Isaias 40:15) and ים yam "sea". This translation was subsequently rendered stella maris ("star of the sea") due to scribal error or as a result of 3rd century vowel shifts, from which comes the Virgin Mary's title Star of the Sea.

Alternatively, the name can be interpreted "star of the sea" if taken as a contracted form of the Hebrew מאור ma'or "star" (lit. "luminary") plus ים yam "sea", yet this "strikes as a very free interpretation".

Rashi, an 11th-century Jewish commentator on the Bible, wrote that the name was given to the sister of Moses because of the Egyptians' harsh treatment of Jews in Egypt. Rashi wrote that the Israelites lived in Egypt for two hundred ten years, including eighty-six years of cruel enslavement that began at the time Moses' elder sister was born. Therefore, the girl was called Miriam, because the Egyptians made life bitter (מַר, mar) for her people.

Because of Mary's great religious significance, variants of her name are often given to girl children in both the Western and Arab worlds. In the Quran, Mary's name assumed the Arabic form Maryam (مريم), which has also passed into other languages. The Greek variant Maria passed into Latin and from thence into many modern European languages.

== Biblical and apocryphal figures ==
- Miriam, the sister of Moses
- Woman with seven sons, Jewish martyr described in 2 Maccabees 7, named in Lamentations Rabbah as Miriam bat Tanhum
- Mariam (Mary), the mother of Yeshua (Jesus)
- Mariam (Mary) of Magdala
- Mariam, wife of Clopas

== People named Miriam ==
- Mary the Jewess, also known as Miriam the Prophetess, an early alchemist believed to have lived some time between the first and third centuries AD
- Miriam, daughter of Rashi
- Miriam, Princess of Turnovo (born 1963), Spanish jewellery designer
- Miriam Andrés (born 1976), Spanish politician
- Miriam Barnes (born 1983), American hurdler and sprinter
- Miriam Ben-Porat (1918–2012), Israeli judge and state comptroller
- Miriam Blanchard, Dominican politician
- Miriam Esther Brailey (1900–1976), American physician
- Miriam Brouwer (born 1991), Canadian cyclist
- Miriam Butterworth (1918–2019), American educator, politician, and activist
- Miriam Cani (born 1985), Albanian singer
- Miriam Caracciolo di Melito (1888–1966), American socialite and Italian countess
- E. Miriam Coyrière (fl. 1880), American businesswoman
- Miriam Daly (1928–1980), Irish civil rights activist and republican leader
- Miriam Davoudvandi, German music journalist and radio personality
- Miriam Dean, New Zealand Queen's Counsel
- Miriam Dominikowska (born 2001), Polish para athlete
- Miriam Howard Dubose (1862–1945), American suffragist
- Miriam Flynn (born 1952), American voice artist and character actress
- Miriam Gallardo (born 1968), Peruvian volleyball player
- Miriam Goldberg (1916–2017), American newspaper publisher and editor
- Miriam Gonzalez (born 1977), Playboy playmate
- Miriam González Durántez (born 1968), Spanish international trade lawyer and wife of former Deputy Prime Minister of the United Kingdom Nick Clegg
- Miriam Ezagui, American nurse and TikToker
- Miriam Hodgson (1938–2005), British editor of children's books
- Mirjam Indermaur (born 1967), Swiss author
- Miriam Israeli (born 1966), American-Israeli singer and lyricist
- Miriam Kara (born 1938), Israeli Olympic gymnast
- Miriam Kochan (1929–2018), English writer and translator
- Miriam Learra (1936–2025), Cuban film, television and theatre actress
- Miriam Leone (born 1985), Miss Italia 2008
- Miriam Leslie (1828–1914), American author, publisher, woman suffrage advocate, and philanthropist
- Miriam Lexmann (born 1972), Slovak politician
- Miriam Makeba (1932–2008), South African singer and activist
- Miriam Margolyes (born 1941), British actress
- Miriam McDonald (born 1987), Canadian actress, star of Degrassi: The Next Generation
- Miriam Miranda, Honduran human rights activist
- Miriam Moses (1884–1965), British politician
- Miriam Nagl (born 1981), Brazilian golfer
- Miriam O'Callaghan (media personality) (born 1960), Irish television presenter
- Miriam Pirazzini (1918–2016), Italian singer
- Mirjam Pressler (1940–2019), German novelist and translator
- Miriam Quiambao (born 1975), Filipino entertainer and beauty pageant titleholder
- Miriam Ramón (born 1973), Ecuadorian racewalker
- Miriam Saphira, New Zealand lesbian activist and psychologist
- Miriam Soledad Raudez Rodríguez, Nicaraguan politician
- Miriam Roth (1910–2005), Israeli educationist
- Miriam Defensor Santiago (1945–2016), Senator in the Philippines
- Miriam Shaviv (born 1976), literary editor of the Jerusalem Post
- Miriam Siderenski (born 1941), Israeli Olympic runner
- Miriam Soares (born 1965), Brazilian footballer
- Miriam Stockley (born 1962), English South African-born singer
- Miriam Stoppard (born 1937), British physician, author, television presenter, and agony aunt
- Miriam Strunge (born 1987), German politician
- Miriam Syowia Kyambi (born 1979), Kenyan artist
- Miriam Timothy (1879–1950), British harpist
- Miriam Toews (born 1964), Canadian author
- Miriam Beizana Vigo (born 1990), Spanish writer and literary critic
- Miriam Weeks (born 1995), pseudonym Belle Knox, American former pornographic actress
- Miriam Yalan-Shteklis (1900–1984), Israeli writer and poet
- Miriam Zetter (born 1989), Mexican ten-pin bowler

== People named Myriam ==
The letter y in the transliteration Miryam represents the palatal glide /j/. The metathesized spelling Myriam has also gained some currency, especially in France, alongside Miriam and Miryam.

The name of Israeli or Lebanese people called "Miriam" may be transliterated Miryam or Myriam depending on whether the context of the transliteration is French or English.

- Myriam Abel or Myriam Morea (born 1981), French singer of Algerian descent
- Myriam Baverel (born 1981), French martial artist
- Myriam Bédard (born 1969), retired Canadian athlete
- Myriam Bru (born 1930), French actress
- Myriam Birger (born 1951), French pianist
- Myriam Boileau (born 1977), Canadian diver
- Myriam Berthé (born 1967), Senegalese tennis player
- Myriam Casanova (born 1985), Swiss tennis player
- Myriam Charpentier, British molecular biologist
- Myriam Montemayor Cruz (born 1981), Mexican pop star known as "Myriam"
- Myriam Fares (born 1983), Lebanese singer
- Myriam Fox-Jerusalmi (born 1961), French canoeist
- Myriam Glez (born 1980), French swimmer
- Myriam Hernández (born 1967), Chilean singer-songwriter and television presenter
- Myriam Korfanty (born 1978), French handball player
- Myriam Lignot (born 1975), French synchronized swimmer
- Myriam Léonie Mani (born 1977), Cameroonian athlete
- Myriam Marbe (1931–1997), Romanian composer and pianist
- Myriam Merlet (c. 1957–2010), Haitian political activist
- Myriam Moscona (born 1955), Mexican journalist
- Myriam Muller (born 1971), Luxembourgian actress
- Myriam Palacios (1936–2013), Chilean actress and comedian
- Myriam Sarachik (1933–2021), Belgian physicist
- Myriam Shehab (born 1982), Lebanese singer
- Myriam Sienra (1939–2020), Paraguayan actress
- Myriam Sirois (born 1975), Canadian actress
- Myriam Soumaré (born 1986), French athlete
- Myriam Vanlerberghe (born 1961), Belgian politician
- Myriam Verreault, Canadian film director and screenwriter
- Myriam Yardeni (1932–2015), Romanian-born Israeli historian

== See also ==
- Maryam (name)
