= Mirjam =

Female given name

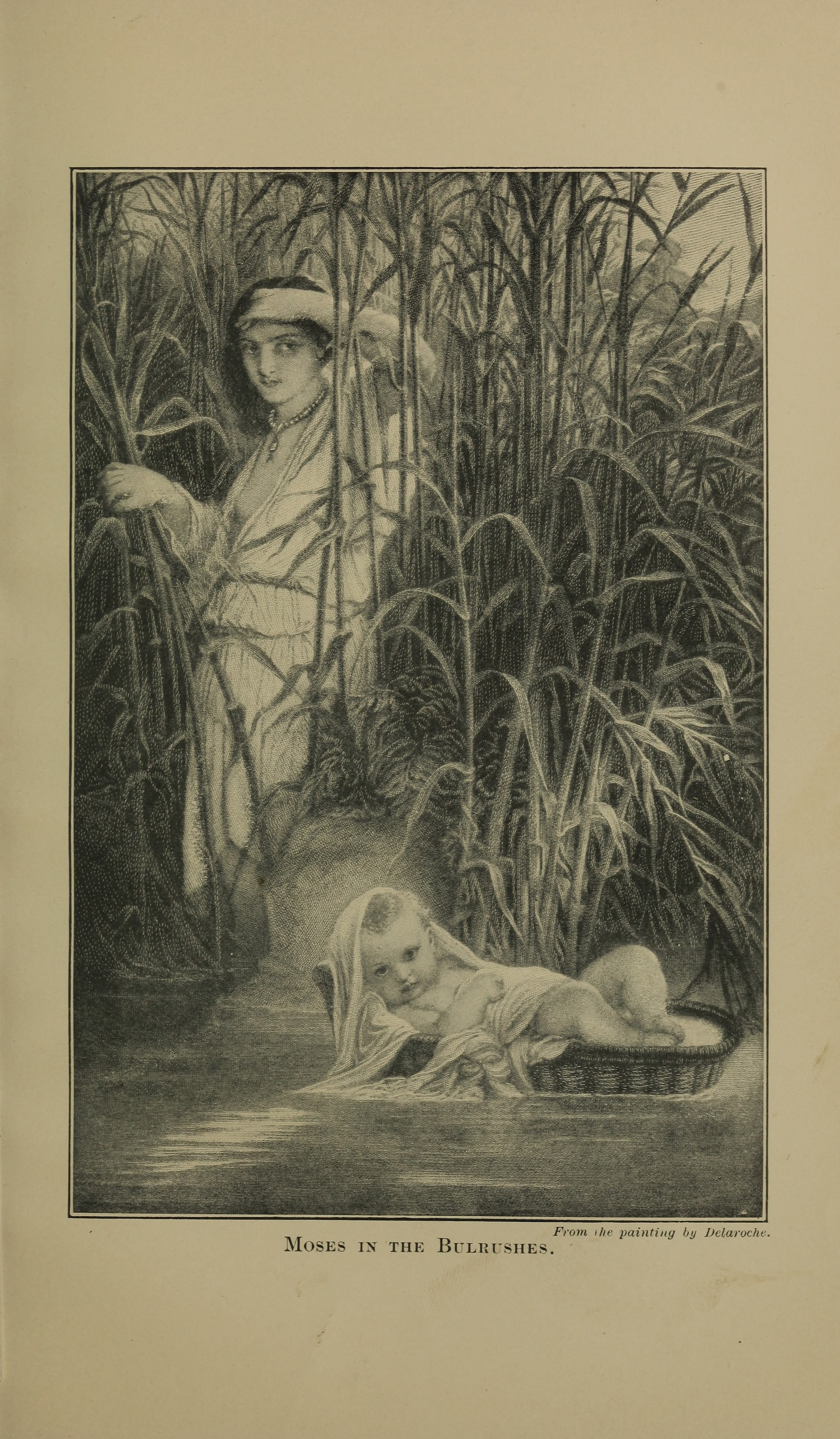
Maryam and Moses painting in a Bible

Mirjam is a Dutch, Estonian, Finnish, Swedish, and German feminine given name cognate to Miriam. Notable people with the name include:

- Mirjam Bikker (born 1982), Dutch politician
- Mirjam Björklund (born 1998), Swedish tennis player
- Mirjam Blaak (born 1956), Ugandan politician
- Mirjam Bolle-Levie (born 1917), Dutch-Israeli Holocaust survivor and centenarian
- Mirjam Bos (born 1989), Dutch human rights activist
- Mirjam Brusius, German science historian
- Mirjam Cvetič, Slovenian-American physicist
- Mirjam Ernestus (born 1969), Dutch psycholinguist
- Mirjam Finkelstein (1933–2017), German Holocaust survivor and educator
- Mirjam Gysling (born 1987), Swiss cyclist
- Mirjam Hauser-Senn (born 1980), Swiss cyclist
- Mirjam van Hemert (born 1950), Dutch swimmer
- Mirjam Hooman-Kloppenburg (born 1966), Dutch table tennis player
- Mirjam Indermaur (born 1967), Swiss author
- Mirjam Jacobson (1887–1945), Dutch artist
- Mirjam Jäger-Fischer (born 1977), Austrian politician
- Mirjam Jäger (born 1982), Swiss freestyle skier
- Mirjam Katzin (born 1986), Swedish academic
- Mirjam de Koning (born 1969), Dutch Paralympic swimmer
- Mirjam Krijnen (born 1973), Dutch politician
- Mirjam Kristensen (born 1978), Norwegian writer
- Mirjam Kuenkler, German political scientist
- Mirjam Liimask (born 1983), Estonian hurdler
- Mirjam Melchers (born 1975), Dutch cyclist
- Mirjam Mous (born 1963), Dutch writer
- Mirjam Müntefering (born 1969), German author and a lesbian
- Mirjam Müskens (born 1967), Dutch taekwondo practitioner
- Mirjam Novak (born 1985), German actress
- Mirjam Novero (1915–1996), Finnish actress
- Mirjam Oldenhave (born 1960), Dutch writer
- Mirjam Orsel (born 1978), Dutch volleyball player
- Mirjam Ott (born 1972), Swiss curler
- Mirjam Overdam (born 1973), Dutch water polo player
- Mirjam Polkunen (1926–2012), Finnish writer, literature researcher, translator and dramatist
- Mirjam van Praag (born 1967), Dutch university teacher and econometrist
- Mirjam Pressler (1940–2019), German translator and children's writer
- Mirjam Puchner (born 1992), Austrian alpine skier
- Mirjam Schmidt (born 1977), German politician
- Mirjam Sterk (born 1973), Dutch politician
- Mirjam Tally (born 1976), Estonian composer
- Mirjam Timmer (born 1982), Dutch singer-songwriter
- Mirjam Tola (born 1972), Albanian operatic soprano
- Mirjam Weichselbraun (born 1981), Austrian television host and actress
- Mirjam Wiesemann (born 1964), German actress

Mirijam

- Mirijam Contzen (born 1976), German-Japanese violinist

== See also ==
- Maryam (name), including Mariam, Mariyam, Marriyum, Myriem
- Meryem, including Meriem
- Miriam (given name), including Meriam, Mirriam, Miryam, Myriam
