= Müntefering =

Müntefering is a German surname. Notable people with the surname include:

- Franz Müntefering (born 1940), German politician
- Michelle Müntefering (born 1980), German politician
- Mirjam Müntefering (born 1969), German author, daughter of Franz
