= Adana Demirspor (women's football) =

Women's football club in Turkey

Adana Demirspor Women
- Full name: Adana Demirspor Women's Football Department
- Nicknames: Mavi Şimşekler (Blue Lightnings)
- Short name: ADS
- Founded: 28 December 1940; 85 years ago
- Ground: Muharrem Gülergin Stadium
- President: Murat Sancak
- Head coach: (Turkey) Meryem Özyumşak
- League: Turkish Women's Super League
- 2021–22: 5th in Group B
- Website: http://www.adanademirspor.org.tr/
Home colours	Away colours	Third colours

Adana Demirspor Women's Football (Turkish: Adana Demirspor Kadın Futbol Takımı) is the women football section of Adana Demirspor, a major sports club based in Adana. The department was formed from the women's football department of Adana İdman Yurdu which merged with Adana Demirspor in August 2022.

== History ==
Adana İdman Yurdu sports club was founded in 1993 with the women's football department. The team was promoted to the Women's First League following the 2008–09 season in the Women's Second League. In the 2010–11 season, they placed third, their best achievement so far. The team finished the 2015–16 season ranking at 7th place. They were relegated to the Second League after losing the play-out matches in the 2016–17 season.

The team play in the 2021–22 season of the Women's Super League. The team is sponsored by the local securities company "Dinamik Menkul Değerler A.Ş." .

== Statistics ==
As of 9 March 2022.

Season	League	Pos.	Pld	W	D	L	GF	GA	GD	Pts
2008–09	Second League – Div. 4	1	8	6	2	0	27	8	+19	20
2009–10	First League	6	18	7	2	9	32	36	−4	23
2010–11	First League	3	22	15	1	6	73	34	+39	46
2011–12	First League – Div. B	4	10	3	3	4	11	14	−3	12
2012–13	First League	8	18	4	2	12	24	43	−19	14
2013–14	First League	5	14	6	4	4	27	26	+1	22
2014–15	First League	4	18	10	1	7	33	23	+10	31
2015–16	First League	7	18	6	2	10	41	51	−10	20
2016–17	First League	9	26	7	1	18	34	78	−44	22
2017–18	Second League Div. A	6	14	6	0	8	30	24	+6	15
2018–19	Second League	3	28	22	4	2	77	19	+58	70
2019–20	First League	11 (^{1})	16	3	0	13	18	57	-39	9
2020–21	First League Gr. B	5	4	2	2	0	5	4	1	8
2021–22	Super League Gr. B	3 (^{2})	14	9	3	2	34	16	+18	30
Green marks a season followed by promotion, red a season followed by relegation.

- (^{1}) Season discontinued due to COVID-19 pandemic in Turkey
- (^{2})Season in progress

== Current squad ==
As of 9 March 2022.

Head coach: (Turkey) Meryem Özyumşak

Note: Flags indicate national team as defined under FIFA eligibility rules; some limited exceptions apply. Players may hold more than one non-FIFA nationality.

No.	Pos.	Nation	Player
4		TUR	Gülsüm Çakır
5		TUR	Hande Deniz
6		TUR	Tuana Şahin
7		TUR	Dilara İbiş
8	FW	COD	Marlène Kasaj
9		TUR	Yekta Şimşek
11	FW	TUR	Müzeyyen Dilek Özbiler
13	FW	GAB	Darcy Edzoumou
14	DF	TUR	Songül Ece Altınöz
16		NGA	Maureen Umeugochukwu
17	MF	COD	Flavine Mawete
18	GK	KAZ	Angelina Portnova

No.	Pos.	Nation	Player
19	MF	TUR	Başak Ersoy
20	DF	TUR	Şefika Altındal
21		TUR	Hacer Alara Özil
23		TUR	Tülin Balur
26		TUR	Esma Kevser Aksan
27		TUR	Seda Karadeniz
33		TUR	Büşra Işıl Canoruç
55		TUR	İrem Bir
66	MF	CMR	Viviane Mefire Peka
72		TUR	Selma Aydın
77		TUR	Tuğba Subalığı
99		TUR	Elmas Karakaya

== Honours ==
Turkish Women's First League
Third places (1): 2010–11

== Gallery ==
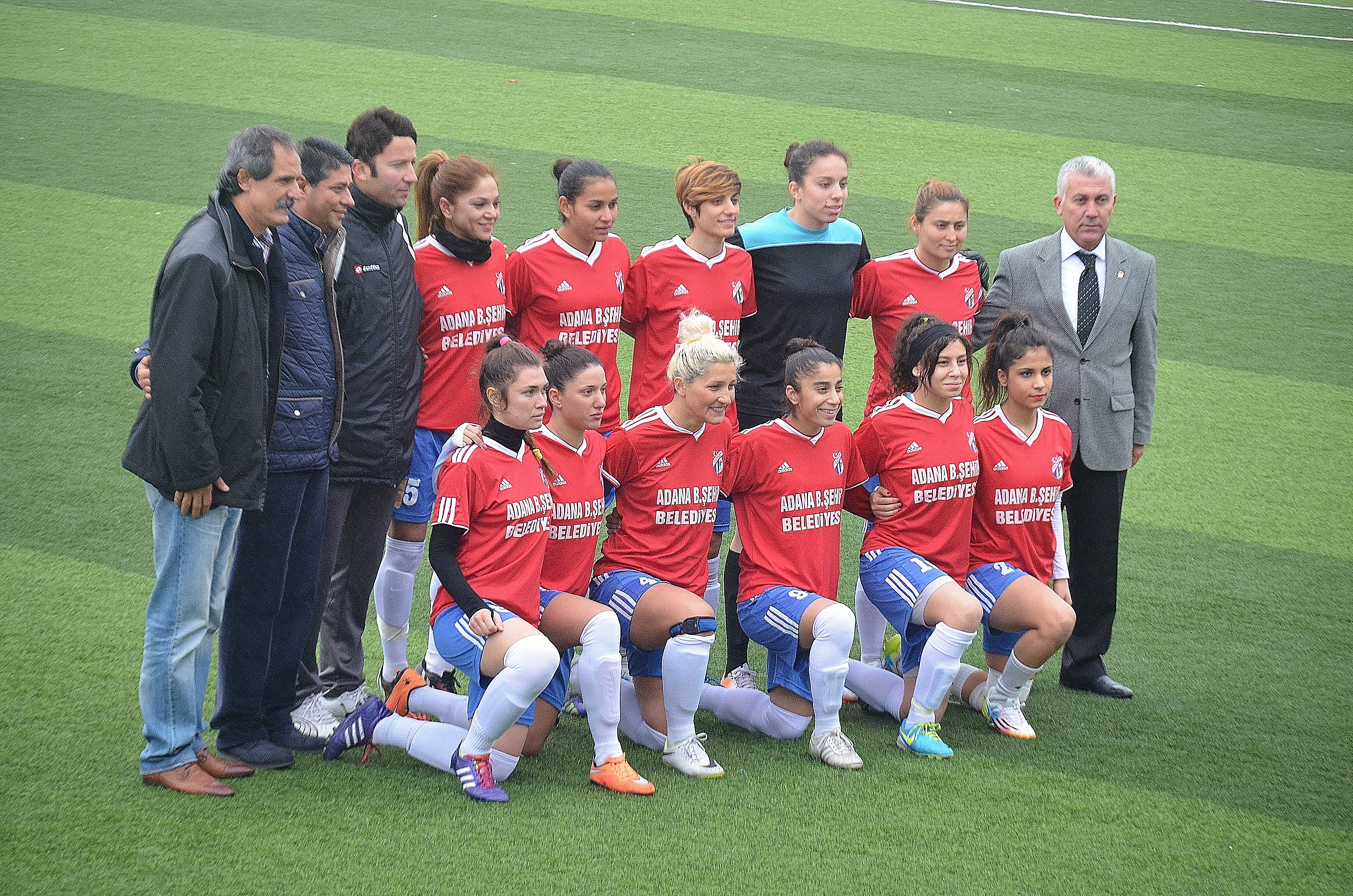
Adana İdman Yurdu squad in the 2014–15 Women's First League season
