= Meriem =

Meriem may refer to:

- Meriem (given name), a feminine Turkish given name
- Meriem (Tarzan), a character in Edgar Rice Burroughs's series of Tarzan novels
