= Sienra =

Sienra can refer to:

- A beach town in Asturias, Spain: San Pelayo de Sienra
- A large family that originated in Spain that emigrated to other areas of the world, especially Uruguay.

Some notable members of this family include:

- Gisel Silva Sienra, semi-finalist in Miss World 1988 representing Uruguay
- José Luis Zorrilla de San Martín, Uruguayan sculptor
- Luis Casaravilla Sienra, well-known tango musician, friend of Carlos Gardel
- Myriam Sienra (1939–2020), Paraguayan actress
- Rodolfo Sienra, President of the Club Nacional de Futbol soccer team, 1983–1985.
- Vera Sienra, Uruguayan singer
