= Jamiri =

German comic artist

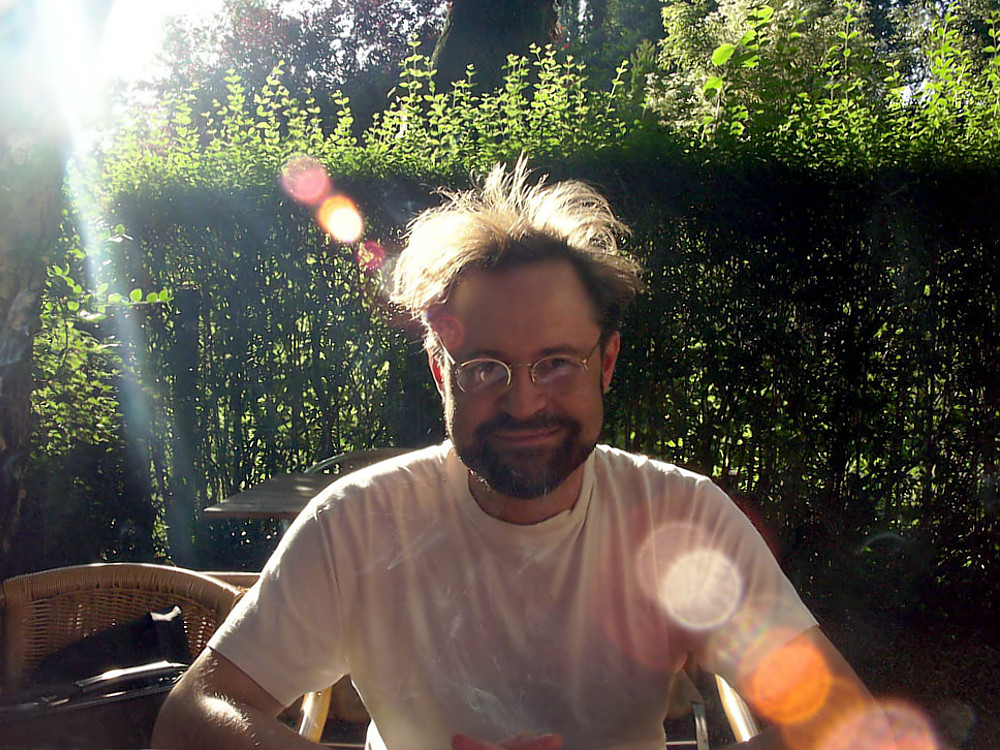
Jamiri.

Jamiri (real name Jan-Michael Richter, born 3 May 1966 in Hattingen-Blankenstein, Germany) is a German comics artists.

Jamiri has published nine comic collections since 1990. He has published one- and two-page comics in German magazines since 1992.

== Biography ==
Jan-Michael Richter attended the Waldorf school in Bochum from 1972 until 1985. In 1985 he attended the Ruhr-University of Bochum where he began studying comparative literature and philosophy. He then switched in 1986 to a design major at the comprehensive university in Essen.

Jan-Michael Richter has lived in Essen since 1986. He married Beate Kleinschmidt in 2000. She often appeared as a character in his comics. The couple separated in October 2014 after 25 years relationship.

== Works ==
=== Comic collections ===
- Bochum lokal (1990, Bospekt-Verlag, Bochum, Germany)
- Carpe Noctem (1994, Unicum Edition, Bochum, Germany; republished 2002, Carlsen-Verlag, Hamburg, Germany)
- Bohème 29 (1995, Unicum Edition, Bochum, Germany; republished 2002, Carlsen-Verlag, Hamburg, Germany)
- Homepages (1997, Unicum Edition, Bochum, Germany; republished 2002, Carlsen-Verlag, Hamburg, Germany)
- Kamikaze d'amour (1999, Eichborn-Verlag, Frankfurt am Main, Germany).
- Dotcom Dummy (2000, Unicum Edition, Bochum, Germany; republished 2002, Carlsen-Verlag, Hamburg, Germany)
- Hypercyber (2002, Carlsen-Verlag, Hamburg, Germany)
- Richterskala (2004, Carlsen-Verlag, Hamburg, Germany)
- Pornorama (2005, Uni-Edition, Berlin, Germany)
- Autodox (2007, Uni-Edition, Berlin, Germany)
