= Hattingen =

- Town
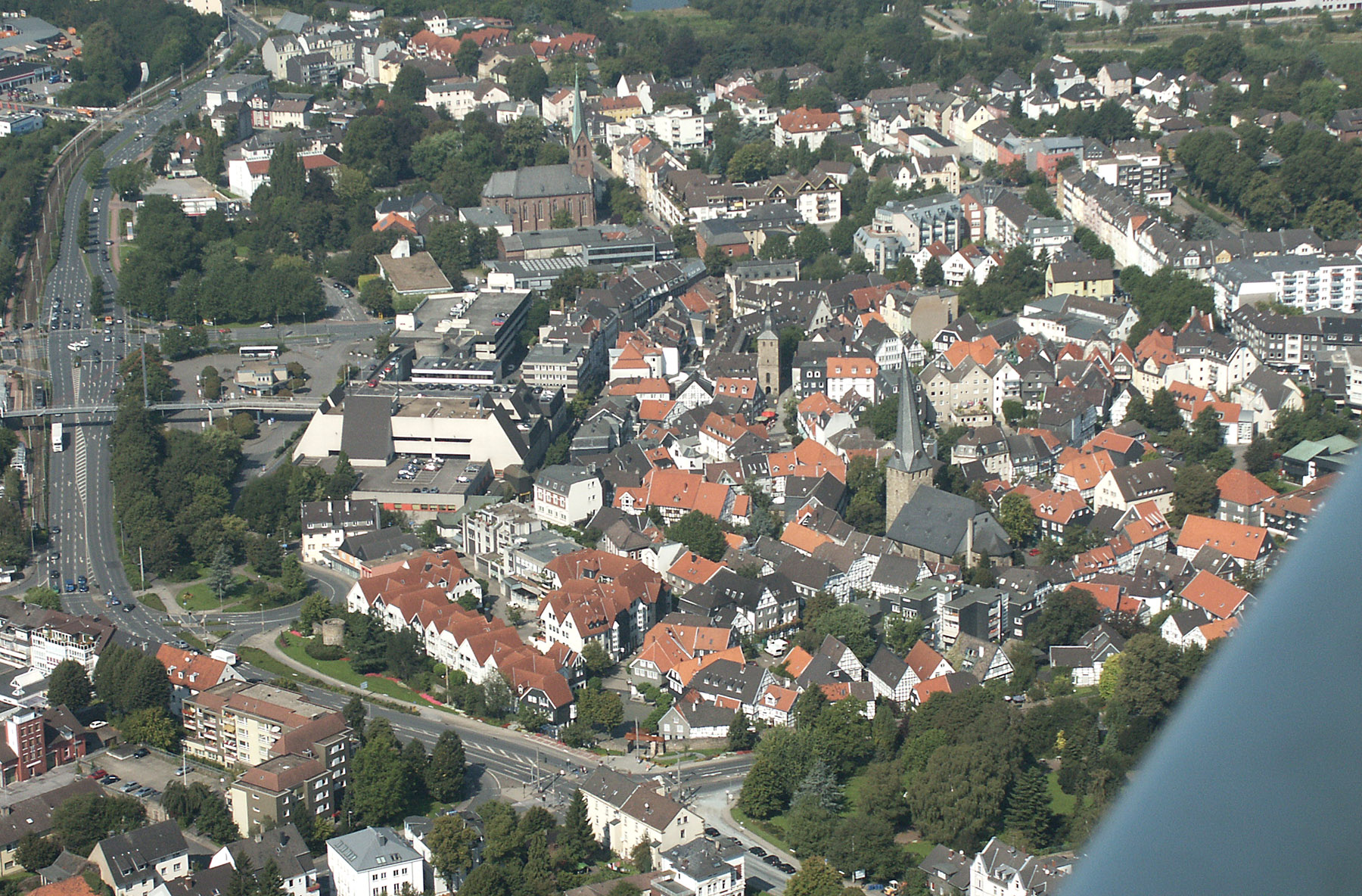
- Aerial view

- Flag Coat of arms

- Location of Hattingen within Ennepe-Ruhr-Kreis district
- Interactive map of Hattingen
- Location within Germany Location within North Rhine-Westphalia
- Coordinates: 51°23′57″N 7°11′09″E
- Country: Germany
- State: North Rhine-Westphalia
- Admin. region: Arnsberg
- District: Ennepe-Ruhr-Kreis

Government
  - Mayor: Melanie Witte-Lonsing (SPD)

Area
  - Total: 71.67 km^{2} (27.67 sq mi)
- Elevation: 60–306 m (197–1,004 ft)

Population (2025-12-31)
  - Total: 52,969
  - Density: 739.1/km^{2} (1,914/sq mi)
- Time zone: UTC+01:00 (CET)
  - Summer (DST): UTC+02:00 (CEST)
- Postal codes: 45525–45527–45529
- Dialling codes: 02324
- Vehicle registration: EN
- Website: www.hattingen.de

Hattingen (German pronunciation: [ˈhatɪŋən]) is a town in the northern part of the Ennepe-Ruhr-Kreis district, in North Rhine-Westphalia, Germany.

== History ==
Hattingen was first mentioned in 1396, when the Count of Mark granted permission to build a city wall. Today, Hattingen has a picturesque historic district with Fachwerk (timber-framed houses) built between the 14th and 16th centuries. The old city is still partly surrounded by the city walls today.

There are three castles remaining within the municipal area of Hattingen. Isenburg Castle was built in the 12th century in the hillsides above the Ruhr. The castle was destroyed in 1225, but prominent ruins remain. Blankenstein Castle was built in the 13th century above the Ruhr river and Haus Kemnade is a moated castle from the 16th century. All three castles are famous tourist landmarks and open to the public.

Hattingen became part of the Hanseatic League in 1554 and became an important trading town. In 1720, there were 52 operating coal mines within the municipal area and Hattingen became one of the first industrial cities of the Ruhr region. Steel production started in 1853, when the Henrichshütte was founded. The Henrichshütte became one of the most important employers of the whole region and dominated the town until it closed in 1987. The Ruhr Valley Railway reached Hattingen in 1869.

In 1970, neighbouring towns like Blankenstein (Ruhr), Welper and Niederwenigern were annexed, growing the city to its current size.

Today, Hattingen still faces problems concerning structural change of the economy, but is becoming a centre of tourism, especially its historical centre and the museum in the old steelworks.

== Geography ==
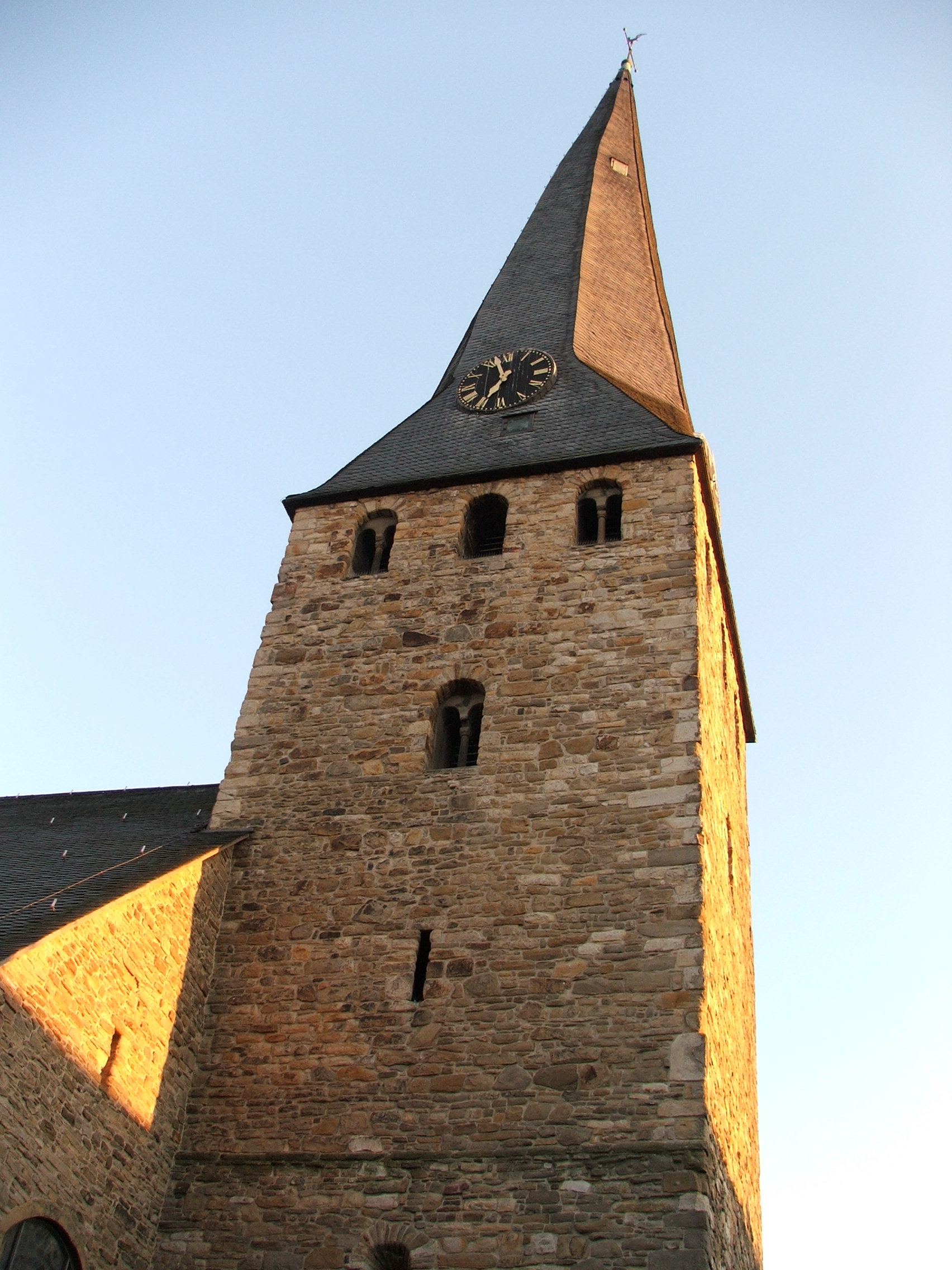
Saint George's church

Hattingen is located on the south bank of the River Ruhr in the south of the Ruhr region. The cities bordering Hattingen are Bochum, Essen, Sprockhövel, Velbert, Witten and Wuppertal.

=== Division of the town ===
Hattingen is divided into the districts of Blankenstein, Bredenscheid-Stüter, Hattingen-Mitte, Holthausen, Niederbonsfeld, Niederelfringhausen, Niederwenigern, Oberelfringhausen, Oberstüter, Welper and Winz-Baak.

== Population ==
Historical population

Year	Pop.	±% p.a.
1965	58,161	—
1970	59,392	+0.42%
1975	58,354	−0.35%
1980	57,374	−0.34%
1985	55,048	−0.82%
1990	58,241	+1.13%
1995	58,650	+0.14%

Year	Pop.	±% p.a.
2000	58,329	−0.11%
2005	56,979	−0.47%
2010	55,510	−0.52%
2015	54,834	−0.24%
2020	54,278	−0.20%
2025	52,969	−0.49%

Source: Landesdatabank Nordrhein-Westfalen

== Notable people ==
- Mathilde Franziska Anneke, feminist
- Erich Warsitz, world's first jet pilot
- John J. Gumperz, sociolinguist
- Harald Siepermann, Character Designer
- Marie-Luise Marjan, actress
- Jamiri (Jan-Michael Richter), comic artist
- Mirjam Müntefering, author
- Caliban (band)
- DJ Quicksilver, Disk Jockey
- Jost Gippert, German linguist
- Luke Hemmerich, German Football Player

== Politics ==
In the local elections of 2004 the Social Democratic Party (SPD) was the largest party on the council with 24 seats. It was followed by the Christian Democratic Union (CDU) with 18 and the Alliance 90/The Greens with 7, the WBG (a conservative lis) and Free Democrats with four each, FLW (also a conservative list) with three, National Democratic Party two, and the PDS/WAL (socialists) and AUF Witten (a left wing list) with one each.

From 2004 to 2020, for the first time in its history, the council was led by a female mayor: Sonja Leidemann (SPD). In the election of 2020 she lost her mandate to Lars König (CDU).

=== Mayor ===
The current mayor of Hattingen is Melanie Witte-Lonsing, who ran as a joint candidate from SPD and the Greens. The most recent mayoral election was held on 14 September 2025, with a runoff held on 28 September, and the results were as follows:

Candidate	Party	First round		Second round	
Candidate	Party	Votes	%	Votes	%
Melanie Witte-Lonsing	Social Democratic Party, Alliance 90/The Greens (SPD, the Greens)	11,151	45.8	9,549	51.3
Nils Brüggemann	Christian Democratic Union, Free Democratic Party (CDU, FDP)	10,895	44.7	9,083	48.8
Nico Schwarz	Die PARTEI	2,322	9.5		
Valid votes		24,368	96.4	18,632	98.8
Invalid votes		903	3.6	220	1.2
Total		25,271	100.0	18,852	100.0
Electorate/voter turnout		43,859	57.6	43,802	43.0
Source: City of Hattingen (1st round, 2nd round)

=== City council ===
Results of the 2020 city council election

The Hattingen city council governs the city alongside the Mayor. The most recent city council election was held on 14 September 2025, and the results were as follows:

Party	Votes	%	+/-	Seats	+/-
Social Democratic Party (SPD)	7,534	30.2	▼3.0	16	±0
Christian Democratic Union (CDU)	7,275	29.1	▼1.7	15	±0
Alternative for Germany (AfD)	4,081	16.3	New	9	New
Alliance 90/The Greens (Grüne)	3,235	13.0	▼10.7	7	▼4
Die Linke	1,233	4.9	New	3	New
Free Democratic Party (FDP)	859	3.4	▼3.4	2	▼1
Die PARTEI	757	3.0	▼2.5	2	▼1
Valid votes	24,974	98.9			
Invalid votes	291	1.1			
Total	25,265	100.0		54	▲6
Electorate/voter turnout	43,859	57.6	▲7.0		
Source: City of Hattingen

=== State Landtag ===
In the Landtag of North Rhine-Westphalia, Hattingen is part of the Ennepe-Ruhr-Kreis I constituency. Rainer Bovermann of the SPD has been representative since the constituency's creation in the 2005 election; he was most recently re-elected in 2017.

=== Federal parliament ===
In the Bundestag, Witten is part of the Ennepe-Ruhr-Kreis II constituency. Axel Echeverria of the SPD was elected as representative in the 2021 German federal election.

== Transport ==
Hattingen was once a minor rail hub, with the Ruhr Valley Railway opening in stages from 1869, allowing access to industrial businesses like the Henrichshütte stellworks. Passenger service to Hagen stopped in 1971, today only heritage trains of the nearby Dahlhausen Railway Museum and sporadic freight trains use it. The Hattingen–Wuppertal Railway operated from 1884-1979. Today line S3 of the Rhine-Ruhr S-Bahn ends at Hattingen Mitte station, a short branch opened in 1987. This station is also the end of route 308 of the Bochum tram network, as well as a hub for local and regional buses.

Autobahn A43 passes the city, the nearest exit being in nearby Witten-Herbede. Provincial and county roads reach out in every direction, with L651 being previously designated as federal highway B51.

== Gallery ==
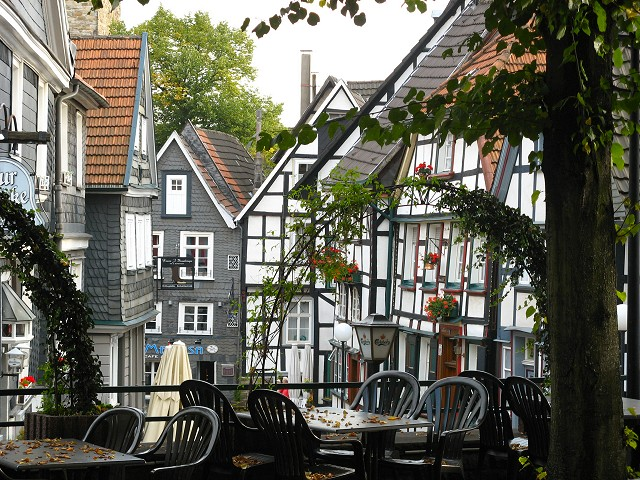
Historic town

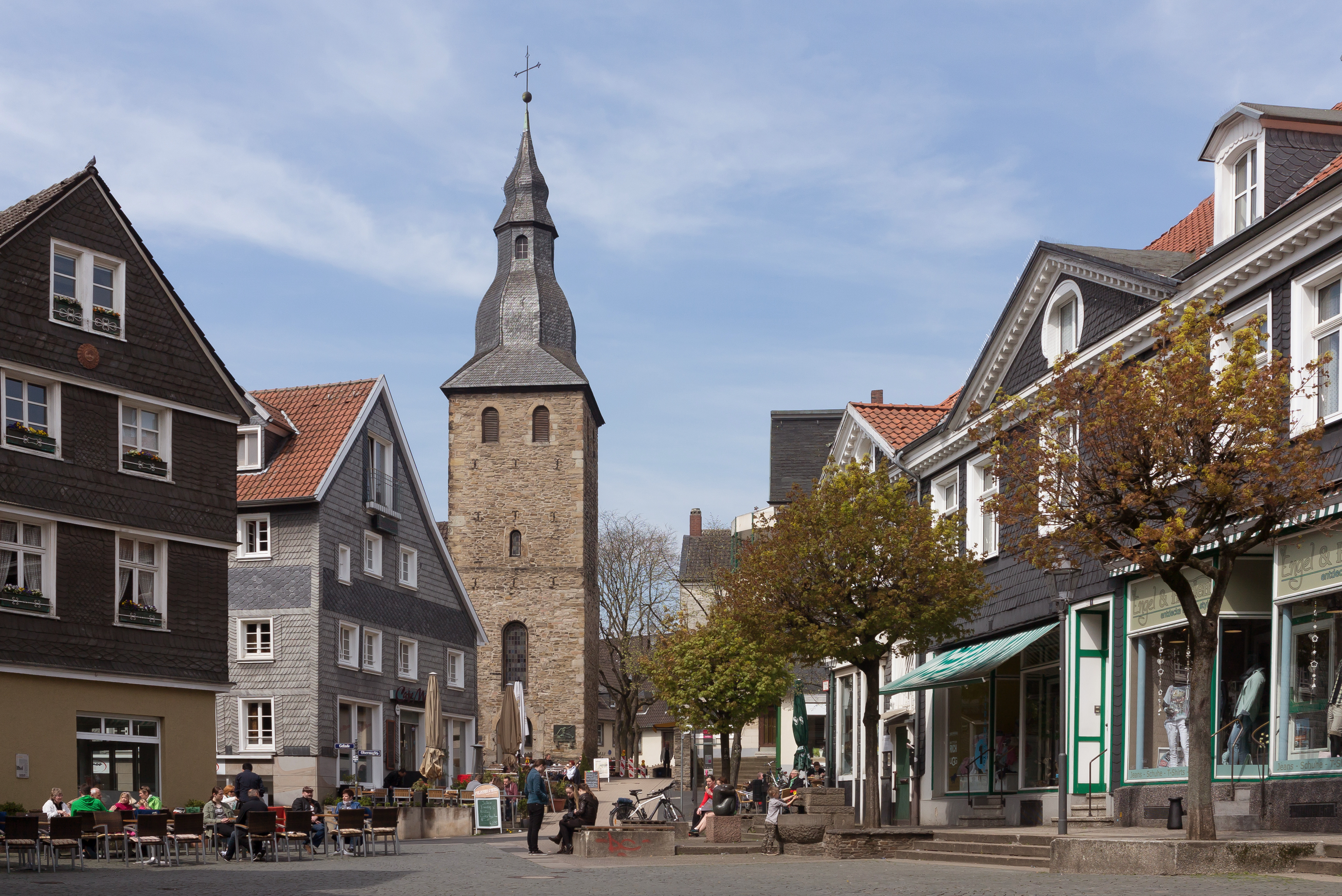
Glockenturm in the background

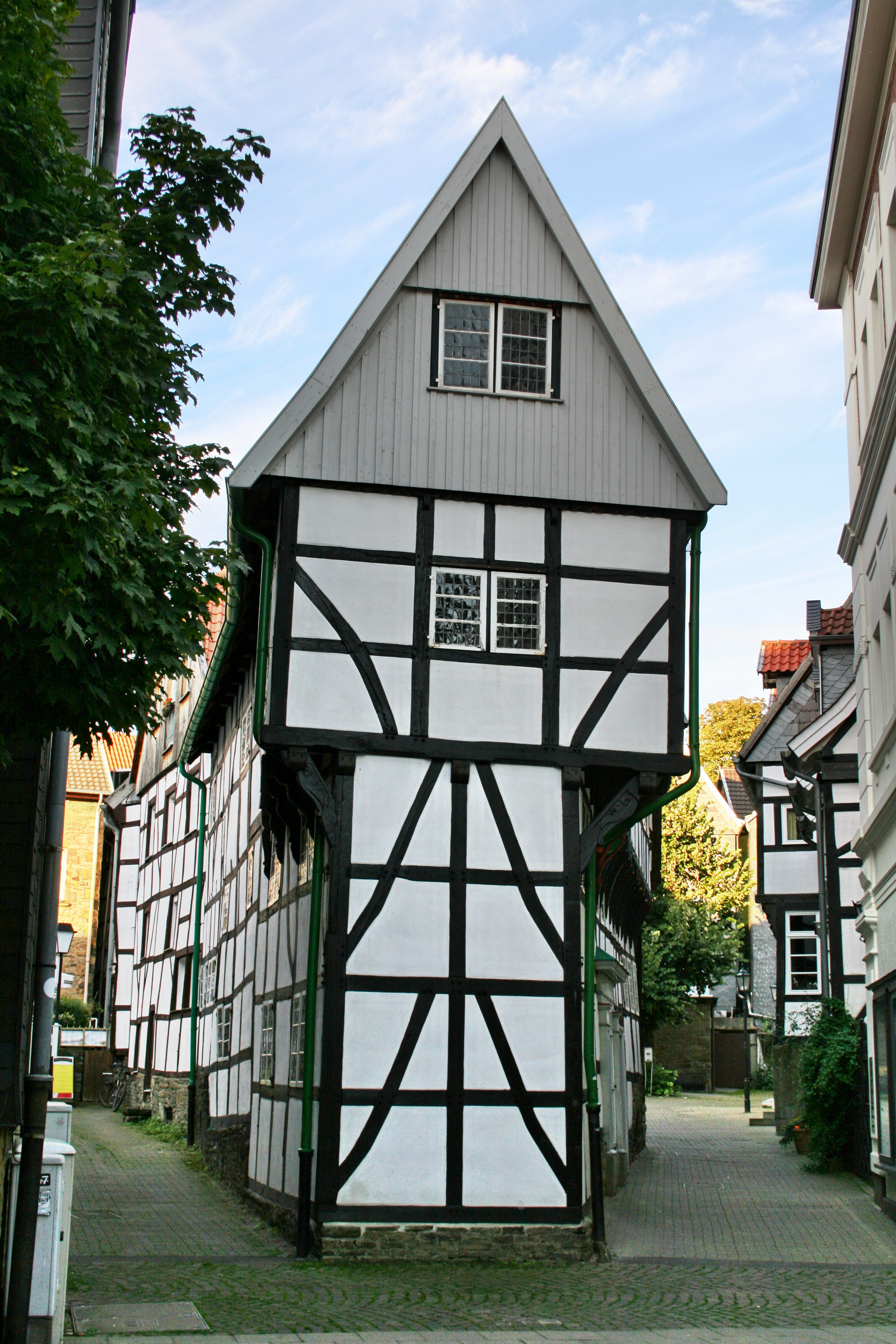
Historic Fachwerk house, the Bügeleisenhaus

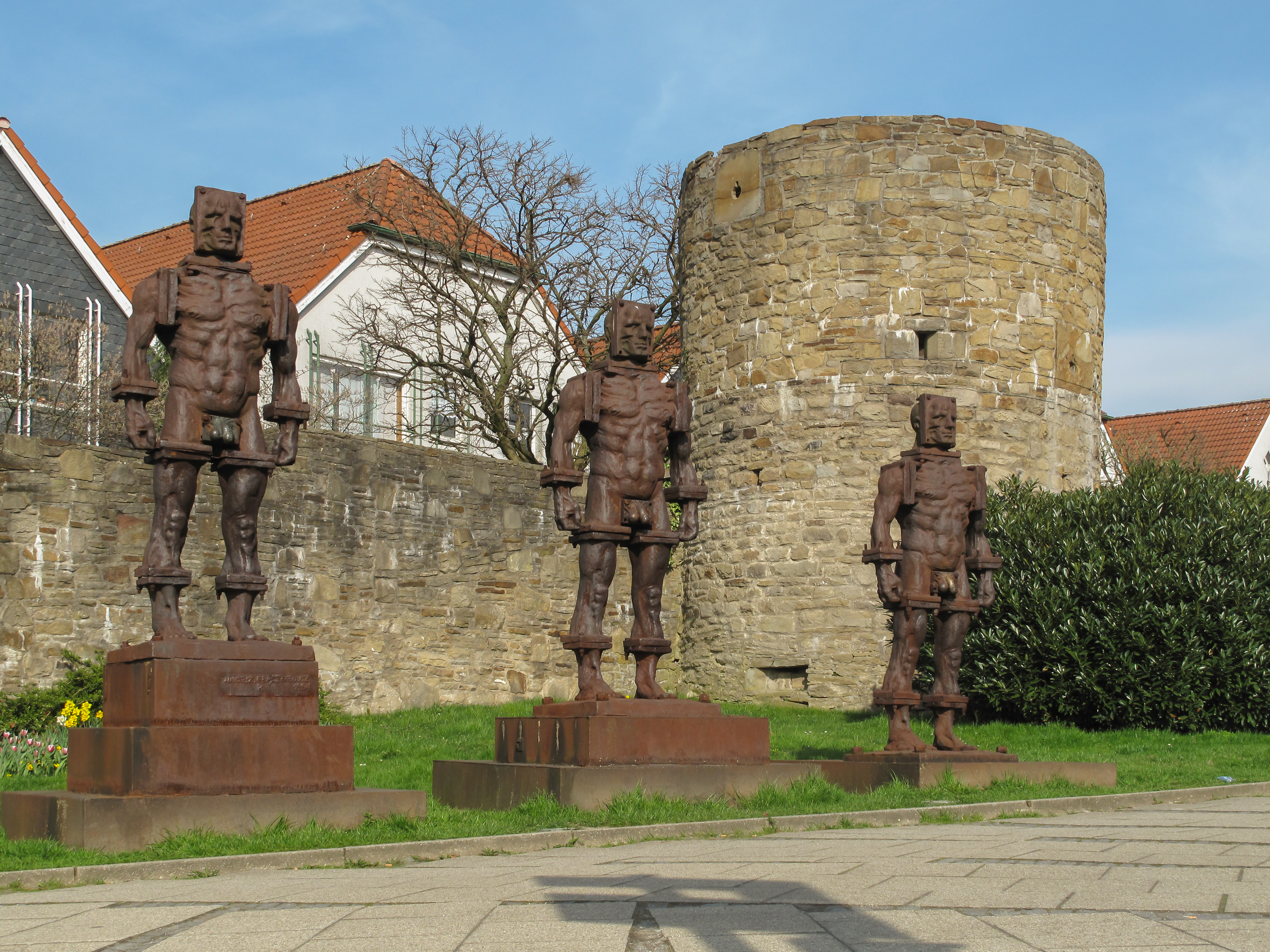
Menschen aus Eisen
