= Martha Reyes =

Nicaraguan politician

Martha Reyes Alvarez is a Nicaraguan politician who currently serves as Minister of Health. She replaced Carolina Davila Murillo in 2020 at the start of the COVID-19 pandemic.
