= Government of Nicaragua =

Nicaragua is a country in Central America with executive, legislative, judicial, and electoral branches of government. The president of Nicaragua is both head of state and head of government. Executive power is exercised by the government.

Legislative power is vested in the National Assembly. The judiciary and electoral powers are independent of the executive and the legislature. The magistrates of both the Supreme Court (CSJ) and the Supreme Electoral Council (CSE) are appointed by the President and ratified by the National Assembly.

== Executive branch ==
The current composition of the executive branch includes Co-President Daniel Ortega and Co-president Rosario Murillo. The cabinet ministers and the directors of government agencies and autonomous entities are appointed by the president, then confirmed by the National Assembly.

=== Cabinet ===
- Co-President of the Republic: Daniel Ortega and Rosario Murillo
- Secretary of the Presidency: Paul Oquist Kelley
- Minister of Agriculture and Forestry: Edward Centeno
- Minister of Defense: Martha Elena Ruiz Sevilla
- Minister of Education, Culture and Sports: Miriam Raudez
- Minister of Energy and Mines: Salvador Mansell Castrillo
- Minister of the Environment and Natural Resources: Juana Argenal
- Minister of Family: Marcia Ramirez Mercado
- Minister of Finance and Public Credit: Iván Acosta Montalván
- Minister of Foreign Affairs: Denis Moncada Colindres
- Minister of Governance: Maria Amelia Coronel
- Minister of Health: Martha Reyes
- Minister of Industry, Development and Commerce: Orlando Solorzano
- Minister of Labor: Alba Luz Torrez Briones
- Minister of Transport and Infrastructure: Pablo Fernández Martínez Espinoza

=== Ministries and dependent entities ===
- Nicaraguan Institute of Sport (Instituto Nicaragüense de Deportes, IND), originally named INJUDE; website
- Ministry of Agriculture and Forestry (Ministerio Agropecuario y Forestal, MAG-FOR); website
  - National Forestry Institute (Instituto Nacional Forestal, INAFOR); website
  - Nicaraguan Institute of Agricultural Technology (Instituto Nicaragüense de Tecnología Agropecuaria (INTA); website
- Ministry of Education, Culture and Sports (Ministerio de Educación, Cultura y Deportes, MECD); website
  - National Technological Institute (Instituto Nacional Tecnológico, INTECNA)
  - Nicaraguan Institute of Culture (Instituto Nicaragüense de Cultura, INC)
- Ministry of the Environment and Natural Resources (Ministerio del Ambiente y los Recursos Naturales, MARENA); website
- Ministry of Family (Ministerio de la Familia, MIFAMILIA); website
  - Nicaraguan Institute for Women (Instituto Nicaragüense de la Mujer, INIM)
- Ministry of Finance and Public Credit (Ministerio de Hacienda y Crédito Público, MHCP); website
  - General Customs Bureau (Dirección General de Aduanas, DGA); website
  - General Revenue Service (Dirección General de Ingresos, DGI); website
- Ministry of Foreign Affairs (Ministerio de Relaciones Exteriores, MINREX); website
  - Ambassadors of Nicaragua (Embajadores de la Republica de Nicaragua)
- Ministry of Governance (Ministerio de Gobernación, MIGOB); website
  - General Directorate of Migration and Alienage (Dirección General de Migración y Extranjería, DGME); website
  - National Penitentiary System (Sistema Penitenciario Nacional, SPN)
  - National Police (Policia Nacional, PN); website
  - Social Security Institute and Human Development (Instituto de Seguridad Social y Desarrollo Humano, ISS-DHU)
- Ministry of Health (Ministerio de Salud, MINSA); website
  - Institute Against Alcoholism and Drug Addiction (Instituto Contra el Alcoholismo y la Drogadicción, ICAD)
  - Centro de Insumos para la Salud, CIPS, Government-owned corporation.
  - Centro de Mantenimiento de Equipos Médicos, Government-owned corporation.
  - Empresa de Insumos no Médicos, Government-owned corporation.
  - Hospital Alemán, Government-owned hospital.
  - Policlínica Oriental, Government-owned health-care center.
- Ministry of Industry and Commercefont (Ministerio de Fomento, Industria y Comercio, MIFIC); website
  - Nicaraguan Institute of Support for the Small and Medium-sized Enterprises (Instituto Nicaragüense de Apoyo a la Pequeña y Mediana Empresa, INPYME); website
  - Nicaraguan Institute of Tourism (Nicaraguan Institute of Tourism, INTUR); website
  - Corporation of Free Trade Zones (Corporación de Zonas Francas, CZF); website
  - Empresa Nicaragüense de Alimentos Básicos, ENABAS, Government-owned enterprise devoted to internal trade, mostly grains.
- Ministry of Labor (Ministerio del Trabajo, MITRAB)
  - National Technological Institute (Instituto Nacional Tecnológico, INATEC); website - Vocational education centers.
- Ministry of Transport and Infrastructure (Ministerio de Transporte e Infraestructura, MTI); website
  - Corporation of Regional Constructor Companies (Corporación de Empresas Regionales de la Construcción, CREC)
- Ministry of Defense (Ministerio de Defensa, MIDEF); website
  - Military Social Security Institute (Instituto de Previsión Social Militar, IPSM); website
  - National System of Prevention, Relieves and Attention to Disasters (Sistema Nacional para la Prevención, Mitigación y Atención de Desastres, SINAPRED); website

=== Decentralized entities ===
- Central Bank of Nicaragua - (Banco Central de Nicaragua, BCN); website
  - National Institute of Statistics and Census (Instituto Nacional de Estadísticas y Censos, INEC); website
- Institute of Rural Development (Instituto de Desarrollo Rural, IDR); website
- National Energy Commission (Comisión Nacional de Energía, CNE); website
- Nicaraguan Institute of Aqueducts and Drains (Instituto Nicaragüense de Acueductos y Alcaltarillados, INAA); website - Regulatory entity of public services.
- Nicaraguan Institute of Municipal Development (Instituto Nicaragüense de Fomento Municipal, INIFOM); website
- Nicaraguan Institute of Telecommunications and Postal Services (Instituto Nicaragüense de Telecomunicaciones y Correos, TELCOR). Regulatory entity of public services. Website
- Nicaraguan Institute of Territorial Studies (Instituto Nicaragüense de Estudios Territoriales, INETER); website
- Nicaraguan Institute of the Urban and Rural Housing (Instituto de la Vivienda Urbana y Rural, INVUR); website
- Office of the Attorney General (Procuraduría General de Justicia)
- Social Emergency Investment Fund (Fondo de Inversión Social de Emergencia, FISE); website

=== Government-owned enterprises ===
==== General ====
- National Corporations of the Public Sector (Corporaciones Nacionales del Sector Público, CORNAP)
- National Lottery (Lotería Nacional); website

==== Dependencies of the Presidency ====
- Channel 6 (Canal 6 de Televisión), not in use.
- National Printing Works (Imprenta Nacional), in process of privatization.
- Olof Palme Convention Center (Centro de Convenciones Olof Palme), in process of privatization.
- Radio Nicaragua website

==== Financial services ====
- Nicaraguan Institute of Insurances and Reinsurances (Instituto Nicaragüense de Seguros y Reaseguros, INISER); website
- Nicaraguan Investment Fund (Financiera Nicaragüense de Inversiones, S.A. FNI); website - The Government holds a 51% share of the investment bank.
  - Rural Credit Fund (Fondo de Crédito Rural, FCR)

==== Public services ====
- International Airport Administration Company (Empresa Administradora de Aeropuertos Internacionales, EAAI); website
- Nicaraguan Aqueducts and Sewer Company (Empresa Nacional de Acueductos y Alcantarillados, ENACAL); website - National water company.
- National Electric Transmission Company (Empresa Nacional de Transmisión Eléctrica, ENTRESA); website
- Nicaraguan Electricity Company (Empresa Nicaragüense de Electricidad, ENEL)
- National Port Authority (Empresa Portuaria Nacional, EPN); website
- Nicaraguan Postal Service (Correos de Nicaragua); website

== Judicial branch ==
- http://www.poderjudicial.gob.ni/

== Autonomous entities ==
- Comptroller General of the Republic of Nicaragua (Contraloria General de la República); website
- Human Rights Prosecutor's Office (Procuraduría de los Derechos Humanos)
- Intendence of Property (Intendencia de la Propiedad)
- Nicaraguan Institute of Energy (Instituto Nicaragüense de Energía, INE); website - Regulatory entity of public services.
- Superintendence of Banks and other Financial Institutions - (Superintendencia de Bancos y Otras Instituciones Financieras, SIBOIF); website
- Superintendence of Pensions (Superintendencia de Pensiones, SIP); website
  - Nicaraguan Social Security Institute (Instituto Nicaragüense de Seguridad Social, INSS); website
- Public Prosecutor's Office (Ministerio Público); website
