= Meryem Aboulouafa =

Moroccan singer-songwriter (born 1988)

Meryem Aboulouafa مريم أبو الوفاء
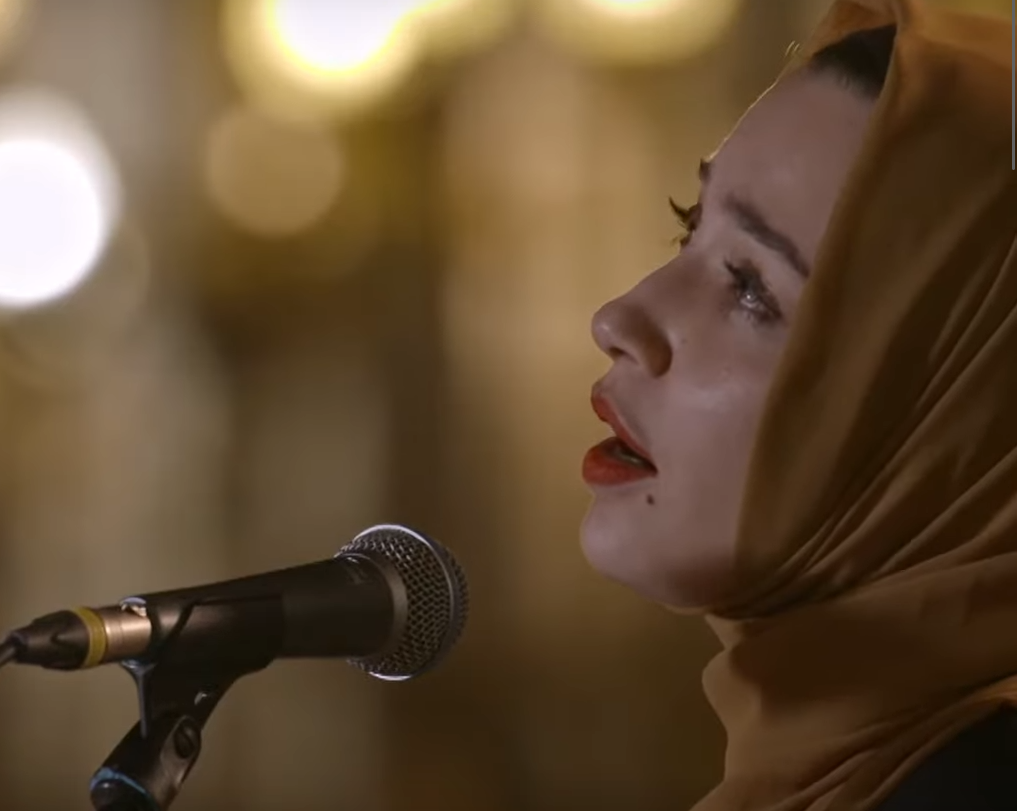
- Aboulouafa performing in Saint-Eustache, Paris / 2022

Background information
- Born: December 3, 1988 (age 37)
- Origin: Casablanca, Morocco
- Years active: 2017–present
- Label: Zerhoun Records

Meryem Aboulouafa (Arabic: مريم أبو الوفاء) is a singer, songwriter and narrator from Casablanca. Her first solo album Meryem (2020), was released by Animal 63 and has received positive reviews throughout the music industry. Her singles Breath of Roma and Ya Qalbi were used for radio, television and film scores. On May 25, 2025, she released “Horses,” the lead single from her upcoming album Family, along with a music video directed by Theo Gottlieb and produced by Birth. The full album, FAMILY, followed on December 3 of the same year under Zerhoun Records.

== Early life ==
Meryem Aboulouafa was born on December 3, 1988, in Casablanca, Morocco. She was introduced to the world of rock classics, including the Neil Young, Rolling Stones, and Pink Floyd, as well as prominent figures in French music such as Edith Piaf, Jacques Brel, and Georges Brassens. Meryem studied at the Conservatoire of Casablanca.

In 2016, Meryem Aboulouafa spoke at the TEDx conference.

After completing her high school education, Meryem enrolled into fine arts at the Ecole Supérieur des Beaux-Arts of Casablanca, and earned a diploma in interior design. Subsequently, she took on the role of teaching interior design at the Academy of Traditional Arts in Casablanca and Euro-Mediterranean University of Morocco. Meryem envisions crafting "musical objects" and exploring the possibility of designing innovative instruments “objets musicaux”, thereby exemplifying her interdisciplinary approach to the arts.

== Career ==
In 2017 as she performed at MadJazz festival in Marrakech and Jazzablanca festival in Casablanca and made one of her first collaborations with Moulay Driss Alaoui Mdaghri, a great fan of Arabic and Andalusian poetry, who opened her the door to Italy, and subsequently to Francesco Santalucia. Together they produced a cover of the Algerian traditional song "Ya Qalbi" which later will become one of her most known songs. The artist moves on to have a musical tour in Indonesia and Italy.

Her song "Ya Qalbi" came to the attention of Emmanuel Barron, the head of the French label Animal63. “Meryem”, the first album by Meryem Aboulouafa was released at the end of May in Europe and Morocco by Animal 63. The 11 songs of the album, composed in both English and Arabic. Before her album release, Emmanuel Barron suggested that he re-record certain titles with new collaborators. Following the release of her album, Meryem toured and made appearances on television and radio. Her debut album was well received.

== Discography ==
=== Studio albums ===
Title	Released	Label	Formats	No.	Tracklist	Duration	
Meryem	29 May 2020	Animal 63	LP, CD, digital download	1	The friend	03:03	38:17
Meryem	29 May 2020	Animal 63	LP, CD, digital download	2	Breath of Roma	03:25	38:17
Meryem	29 May 2020	Animal 63	LP, CD, digital download	3	Deeply	03:21	38:17
Meryem	29 May 2020	Animal 63	LP, CD, digital download	4	Say the truth and run	03:57	38:17
Meryem	29 May 2020	Animal 63	LP, CD, digital download	5	Je me promets	04:30	38:17
Meryem	29 May 2020	Animal 63	LP, CD, digital download	6	Fighting	03:31	38:17
Meryem	29 May 2020	Animal 63	LP, CD, digital download	7	Évanouie	03:33	38:17
Meryem	29 May 2020	Animal 63	LP, CD, digital download	8	The Accident	03:40	38:17
Meryem	29 May 2020	Animal 63	LP, CD, digital download	9	Ya Qalbi	03:06	38:17
Meryem	29 May 2020	Animal 63	LP, CD, digital download	10	Welcome Back to Me	02:47	38:17
Meryem	29 May 2020	Animal 63	LP, CD, digital download	11	We'll get by	03:19	38:17

Family	03 Dec. 2025	Zerhoun Records	LP, CD, digital download	1	Horses	04:27	35:42
Family	03 Dec. 2025	Zerhoun Records	LP, CD, digital download	2	Letter to Andalous	04:08	35:42
Family	03 Dec. 2025	Zerhoun Records	LP, CD, digital download	3	Allah ya Rabbi	03:23	35:42
Family	03 Dec. 2025	Zerhoun Records	LP, CD, digital download	4	Resistance	01:59	35:42
Family	03 Dec. 2025	Zerhoun Records	LP, CD, digital download	5	Family	03:27	35:42
Family	03 Dec. 2025	Zerhoun Records	LP, CD, digital download	6	Hated Love	03:38	35:42
Family	03 Dec. 2025	Zerhoun Records	LP, CD, digital download	7	Moon	03:44	35:42
Family	03 Dec. 2025	Zerhoun Records	LP, CD, digital download	8	Samahtouk	02:49	35:42
Family	03 Dec. 2025	Zerhoun Records	LP, CD, digital download	9	Paranoïa	04:11	35:42
Family	03 Dec. 2025	Zerhoun Records	LP, CD, digital download	10	Greece	03:56	35:42

=== Singles & EP ===
Title	Released	Label
Horses خيول	20 May 2025	Zerhoun
Breath of Roma	2 December 2019	Animal 63
Ya Qalbi	12 February 2020	Animal 63
Évanouie	29 April 2020	Animal 63

=== Other Collaborations & Remixes ===
Title	Artist	Released	Album	Label
60fps	Yan Wagner	16 March 2026	SIngle	Yotanka records
Noi (With Vanni Bianconi)	NITON and guests	22 November 2024	NITON 11	Shameless Rocks
J'irai partout	Dominique Dalcan	27 September 2023	Last Night a Woman Saved My Life	Ostinato Records
D'âme à âme	Anna Chedid	20 October 2023	Peau neueve	Anna Chedid Publishing
Le paradis	Bachar Mar-Khalifé	13 May 2023	The End - Music for Films, Vol.1	Balcoon
Oasi	Elasi	29 July 2022	Oasi Elasi	Capitol Records/Universal Music Italia
Breath of Roma (Remix)	Alper Gursoy	29 November 2021		PalmTherapy Sounds
13.10	Francesco Santalucia	2017	Memoria	La grande onda

== Usage in media ==
2025 - Deeply - La Peur au ventre S7 | E7 | Apple TV
2025 - Breath of Roma - Ginny and Georgia S3 | E10 | Netflix 
2025 - Welcome Back to Me - Ginny and Georgia S3 | E10 | Netflix 
2025 - Breath of Roma - Bref2  S2 | E6 | Closing title | Disney Plus
2024 - The Call of Water - Ministry of Equipment and Water
2023 - Forever Marrakech - L’Office National Marocain du Tourisme
2023 - Le Paradis - Lost Boys (Film)
2023 - Ya Qalbi - Holy Family (aka Sagrada familia) S1 | E2 | Netflix
2022 - Deeply - Skam France S7 | E7 | France TV
2021 - Je me promets - AlRawabi School for Girls  S1 | E4 | Netflix
2021 - Mawadda - (Film by Hicham Lasri)

== Voice Overs ==
2024 - The Call of Water - Ministry of Equipment and Water
2023 - Fez, di Meryem Aboulouafa - RSI La 1
2023 - Do you remember? - Burning Man by Sodalime Burning Man
2022 - Waking dreams  by Mayan Warrior Burning Man
2015 - AMF2015 | Official Trailer (Amsterdam Music Festival)
2014 - Watchtower of Turkey by Meryem Aboulouafa.
