= Blankenstein Castle =

Castle in North Rhine-Westphalia, Germany

Coordinates: 51°24′25″N 7°13′49″E

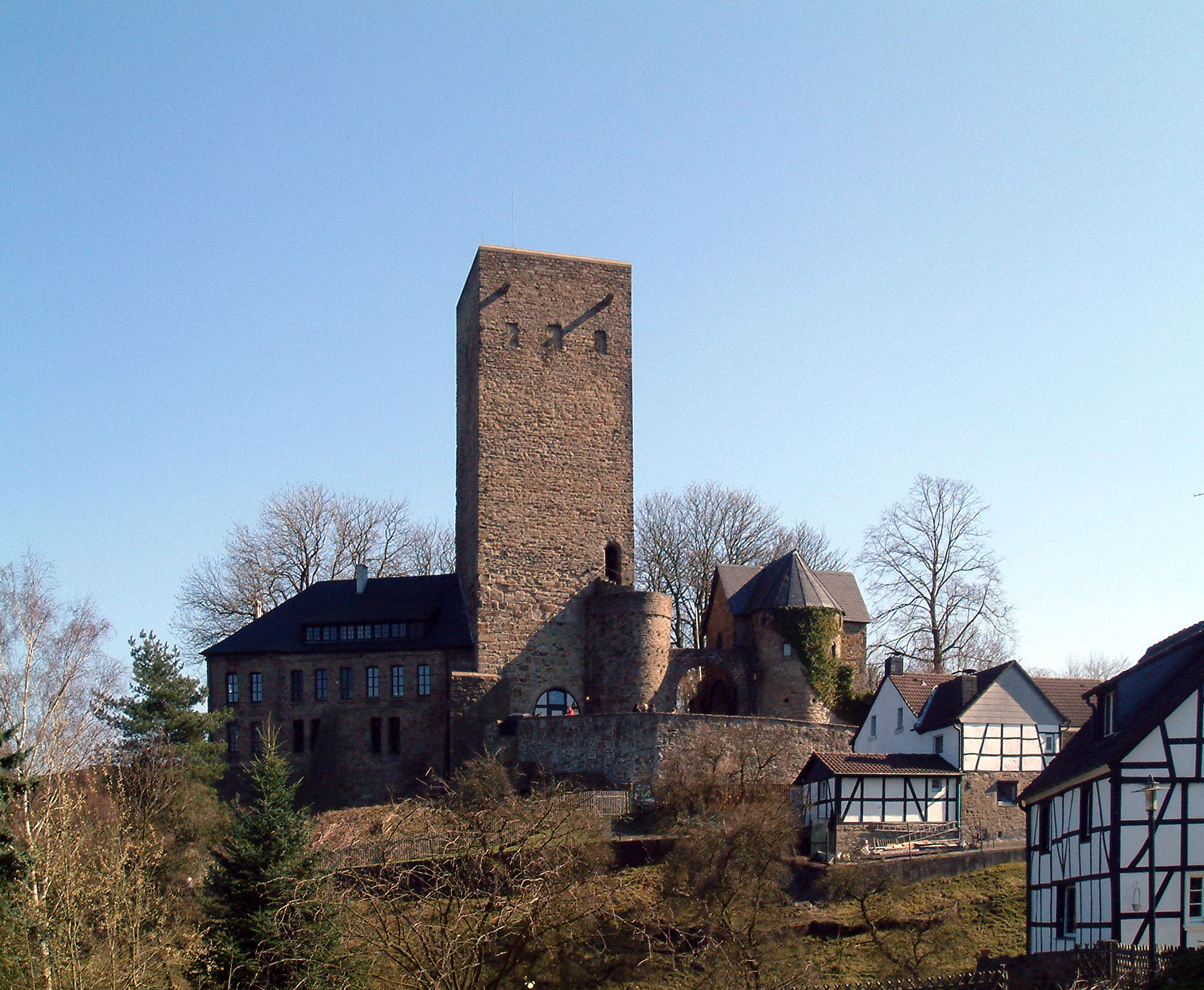
Blankenstein Castle

Blankenstein Castle (German: Burg Blankenstein) is a castle located on the south side of the river Ruhr in Hattingen, North Rhine-Westphalia, Germany.

== History ==
On 12 May 1226, Adolf I, Count of the Mark gave the order to build the castle. He charged Truchsess Ludolf von Bönen with its construction, beginning in 1227. The castle was ready in 1243, but further developed over the course of 200 years by the Counts of the Mark.

By 1425, Blankenstein was one of the most important castles in the county. In 1614, shortly before the Thirty Years' War, it was occupied by Spanish troops. From 1637, the castle fell into disrepair so that, in September 1662, Frederick William, Elector of Brandenburg ordered its demolition. Only the tower and parts of the curtain wall remained.

In 1860, the owner of the ruin, Gustav von Stein, began to rebuild the castle and established a factory there. The property has belonged to the city of Bochum since 1922, but the town is looking for an alternative due to the costs. From 1957 to 1959, most of the buildings of the 19th century were pulled down, but some still remain.

The tower can still be visited and offers a good view over Bochum and the Kemnader Lake.
