= Adana İdman Yurdu =

Football club in Turkey

- Full name: Adana İdman Yurdu Spor Kulübü
- Founded: 1993; 33 years ago
- Ground: Gençlik Stadium
- Capacity: 2,000
- Coordinates: 36°59′56″N 35°19′47″E
- Chairman: Metin Taylancı
- Manager: (Turkey) Necat Baakan
- League: Turkish Women's Super League
Home colours	Away colours

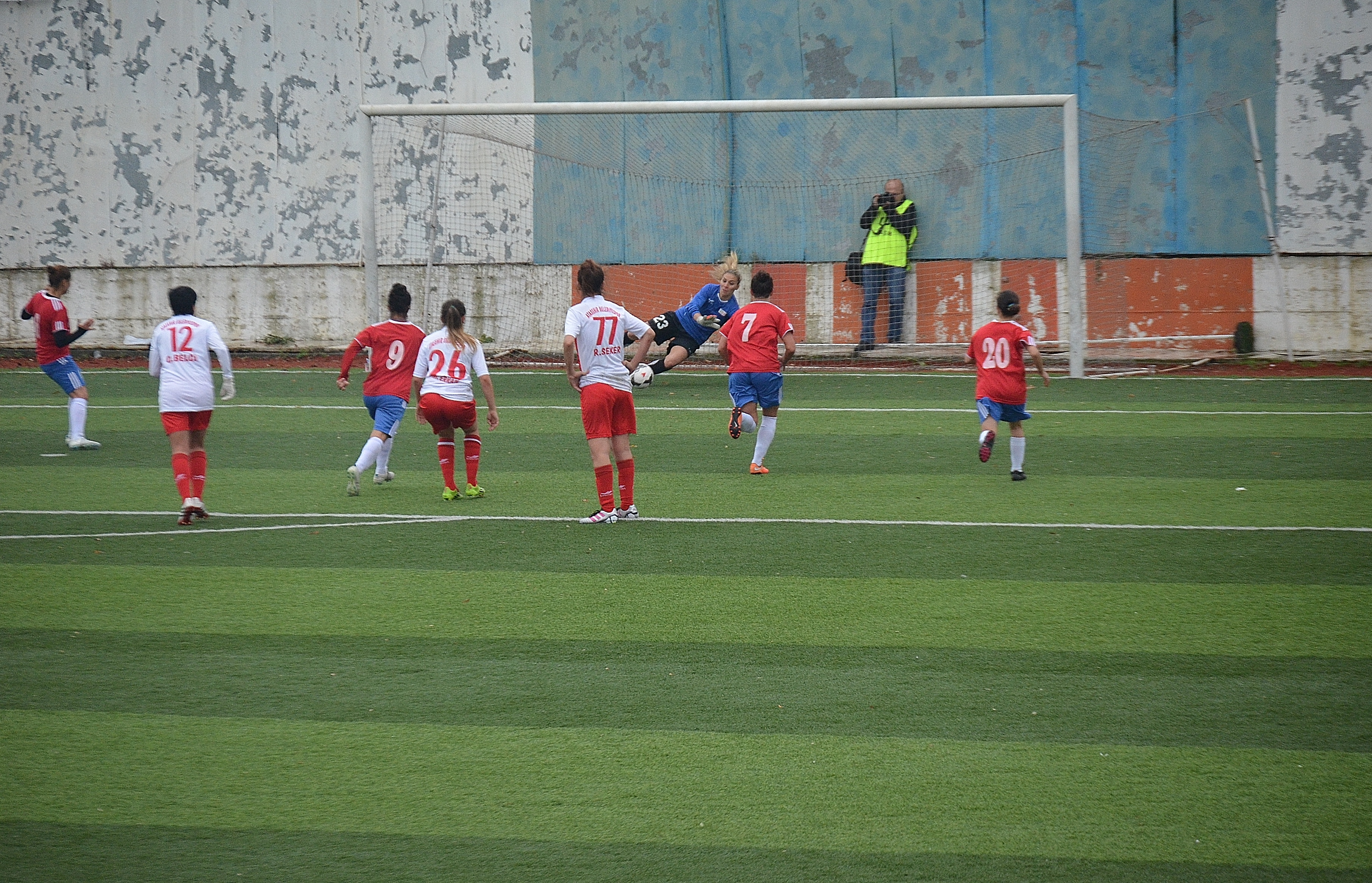
Adana İdman Yurdu player taking a penalty kick against Ataşehir Belediyespor in the 2014–15 season's away match.

Adana İdman Yurdu (Turkish: Adana İdmanyurdu Kadın Futbol Takımı) was a women's association football team based in Adana, Turkey. The club was merged with Adana Demirspor in August 2022 and the women's football department formed the Adana Demirspor's women football department. The team played in the Turkish Women's Football Super League.

== History ==
The club was founded in 1993 with the women's football department. The team was promoted to the Women's First League following the 2008–09 season in the Women's Second League. In the 2010–11 season, they placed third, their best achievement so far. The team finished the 2015–16 season ranking at 7th place. They were relegated to the Second League after losing the play-out matches in the 2016–17 season.

Adana İdman Yurdu are the only women's football team in Adana.

The team play in the 2021-22 season of the Women's Super League. The team's sport gear is sponsored by the local securities company "Dinamik Menkul Değerler A.Ş." and thus is called Bitexen Adana İdmanyurduspor. The team manager is the former women's footballer Meryem Özyumşak.

== Colors ==
Adana İdman Yurdu's colors are navy, red and white.

== Stadium ==
The team play their home matches at the Gençlik Stadium. The venue has a seating capacity of 2,000, and its ground is covered by artificial turf.

== Statistics ==
As of 18 January 2023.

Season	League	Pos.	Pld	W	D	L	GF	GA	GD	Pts
2008–09	Second League – Div. 4	1	8	6	2	0	27	8	+19	20
2009–10	First League	6	18	7	2	9	32	36	−4	23
2010–11	First League	3	22	15	1	6	73	34	+39	46
2011–12	First League – Div. B	4	10	3	3	4	11	14	−3	12
2012–13	First League	8	18	4	2	12	24	43	−19	14
2013–14	First League	5	14	6	4	4	27	26	+1	22
2014–15	First League	4	18	10	1	7	33	23	+10	31
2015–16	First League	7	18	6	2	10	41	51	−10	20
2016–17	First League	9	26	7	1	18	34	78	−44	22
2017–18	Second League Div. A	6	14	6	0	8	30	24	+6	15
2018–19	Second League	3	28	22	4	2	77	19	+58	70
2019–20	First League	11 (^{1})	16	3	0	13	18	57	-39	9
2020-21	First League Gr. B	5 (^{2})	4	2	1	1	5	4	+1	7
2021-22	Super League Gr. B	5	22	10	5	7	40	30	+10	35
2022-23	Super League Gr. B	7 (^{3})	12	4	1	7	20	22	-2	13
Green marks a season followed by promotion, red a season followed by relegation.

- (^{1}): Season discontinued due to COVID-19 pandemic in Turkey
- (^{2}): Finished Group B as leader, lost the first round in the play-offs
- (^{3}): Season in progress

== Current squad ==
As of 18 January 2023.

Head coach: (Turkey) Necat Bakan

Note: Flags indicate national team as defined under FIFA eligibility rules; some limited exceptions apply. Players may hold more than one non-FIFA nationality.

No.	Pos.	Nation	Player
1	GK	KAZ	Angelina Portnova
4		TUR	Bengü Sena Bayrakçı
5	MF	TUR	İrem Bir
6	MF	CMR	Viviane Mefire Peka
7		TUR	Gülsüm Çakır
8		TUR	Tuana Şahin
11		TUR	Büşra Işıl Canoruç
20		TUR	Sude Zorlukol

No.	Pos.	Nation	Player
21		TUR	Arzu Sümeyya Uçar
22	DF	AZE	Kamilla Mammadova
25		TUR	Hacer Şentürk
27		TUR	Pınar Can Demir
30		TUR	Eylem Özkocaman
77		TUR	Gözde Uçar
99	FW	CMR	Berthe Andiolo
—	FW	COD	Marlène Kasaj

== Honours ==
Turkish Women's First League
Third places (1): 2010–11

== Kit history ==
2013–14 home	2014–15 away	2015–16 away	2019–20 away	2020–21 away	2021–22 home

== Squad history ==
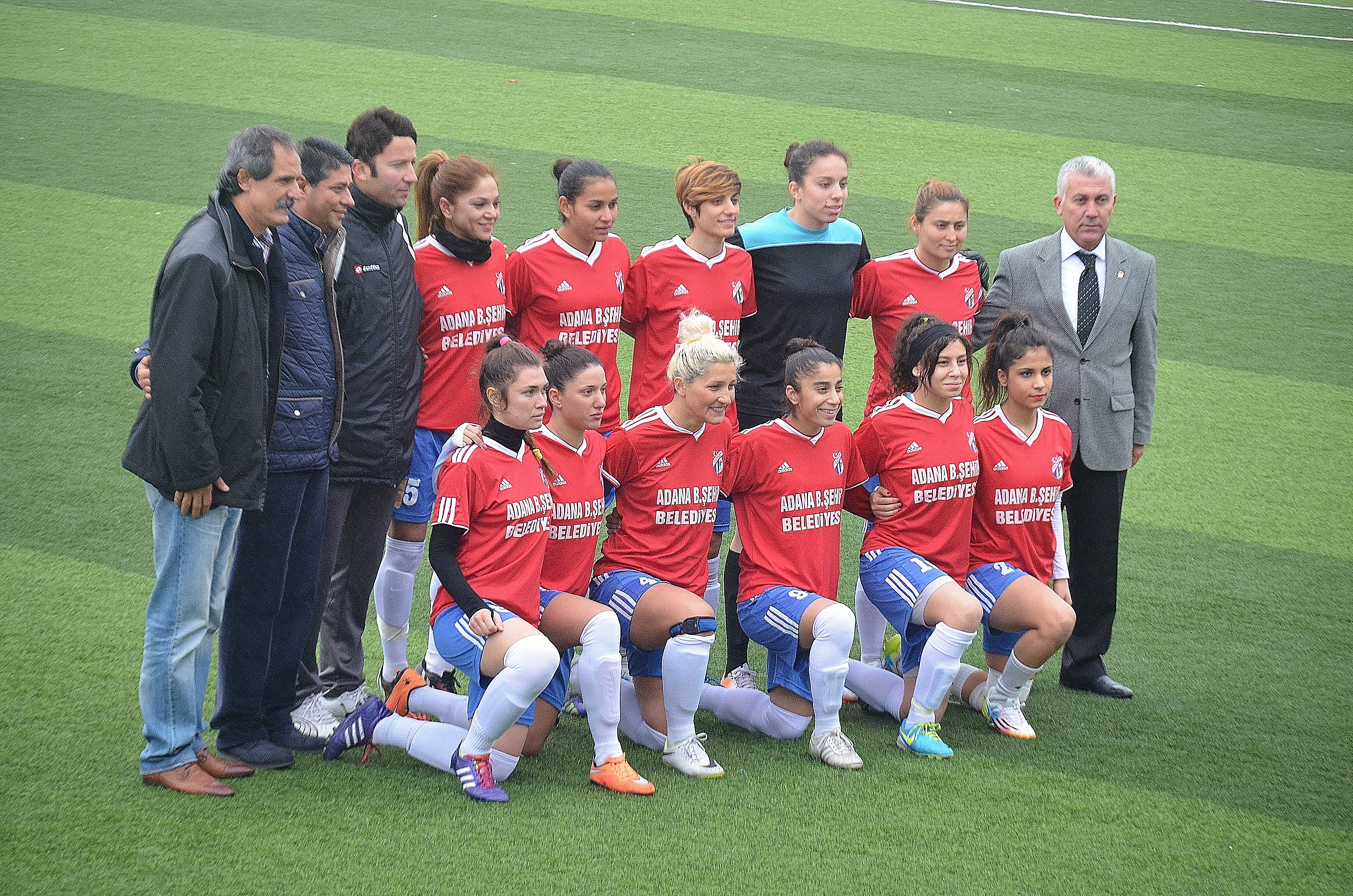
Adana İdman Yurdu squad in the 2014–15 Women's First League season
