= Meryem Yamak =

Turkish footballer (born 1962)

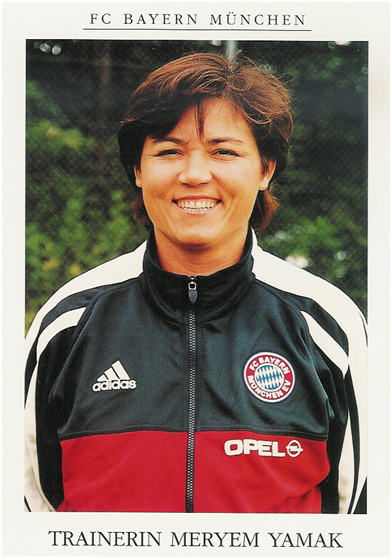
- Meryem Yamak (2015)

Personal information
- Date of birth: 26 August 1962 (age 64)
- Place of birth: Soma, Manisa, Turkey

Senior career*
| Years | Team | Apps | (Gls) |
| 1975–1980 | FC Hochbrück | | |
| 1980–1990 | FC Bayern Munich | | |
| 1991–1993 | FC Wacker München | | |

Managerial career
- 1993–1994: SV Türk Gücü Munich
- 1994–1995: FC Wacker München
- 1999–2001: FC Bayern Munich II
- 2002–2014: Teams and schools in Spain
- 2014: Qatar women's
- * Club domestic league appearances and goals

Meryem Yamak (born 26 August 1962), also known as Meriç Yamak, is a Turkish former football player and coach. Yamak, who currently works as a women's football European representative and scout for the Turkish Football Federation, is the first professional footballer of Turkish origin in Germany. In addition, she is the first woman of Turkish origin with an A license for football coaching.

== Private life ==
Meryem Yamak was born in Soma, Manisa in western Turkey on 26 August 1962. She has four siblings. Early 1970s, her father Hüseyin emigrated to Germany with his wife and five children.

== Playing career ==
Yamak started playing football together with her brothers Yusuf and Aziz, impressing bystanders with her talent. Settled with her family in Bavaria, Germany, she began playing football at age twelve in the youth team of FC Hochbrück, a club in the neighborhood of Garching, Munich.

In 1980, she was signed by FC Bayern Munich. She became the first women's footballer of Turkish origin at Bavarian Football Association (Bayerischer Fussball-Verband, BFV) level and then in Women's Federal League (Frauen-Bundesliga). She enjoyed the victory at the 1981 States Cup (Länderpokal) as a member of the BFV-Select team . Her team Bayern Munich reached the final of the 1982 German Women's Football Championship (Deutsche Frauen Fußballmeisterschaft 1982), becoming runners-up. In 1985, she underwent a knee surgery.

In 1991, she transferred to FC Wacker München. After two seasons, she retired form active playing career in 1993.

== Managerial career ==
Yamak became a licensed football Instructor (1993) and holder of an UEFA B coaching licence (1994), an UEFA A coaching licence (December 1998) and FIFA licensed football instructor (January 2014) as the only sportswoman of Turkish origin. She is a member of the Association of German Football Teachers (Bund Deutscher Fußball-Lehrer, BDFL).

She began her coaching career in 1993 at SV Türk Gücü Munich. She led the boys' team to second place.In 1994, she returned to her former club FC Wacker Munich.

Between 1995 and 1998, she coached the women's team of SpVgg Unterhaching, which were playing in the women's district league (Frauen Bezirksliga) at the time.

From 1999 to 2001, she served as a coach for the women's team FC Bayern Munich II, and as an assistant coach for FC Bayern Munich women's tarm. During this time, the team were promoted twice to the next higher league.

From 2002 to 2014, she coached various youth teams in Spain for several years, before taking charge of the Qatar women's national team in 2014.

In 2016, the Turkish Football Federation appointed her as a scout, representative for entire Europe, to discover promising young women players and future stars for the Turkey women's national teams.
