= Academy of Traditional Arts =

Art school in Casablanca, Morocco

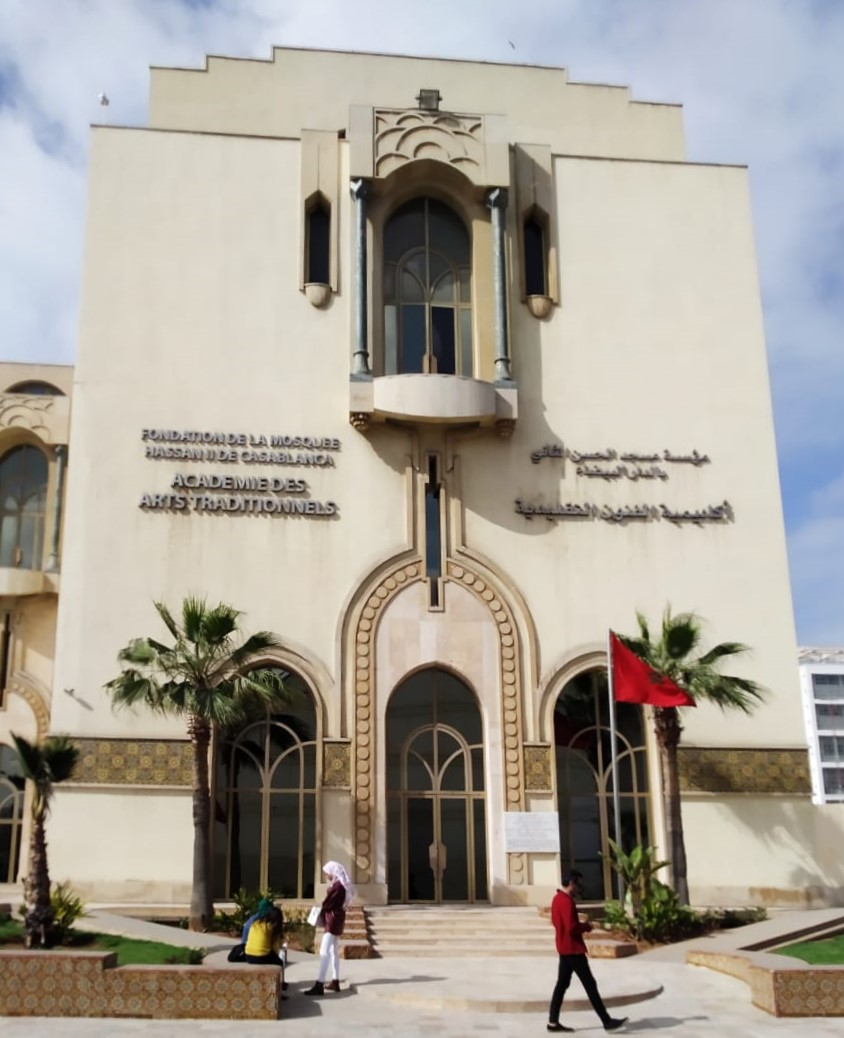
- The Academy of Traditional Arts

Location
- Rue de Tiznit, Casablanca. Morocco; 33°36′20″N 7°37′50″W

Information
- Type: Non profit
- Authority: Hassan II Mosque Foundation
- Principal: Khalil Moualif
- Website: www.aat.ac.ma/ar

The Academy of Traditional Arts (Arabic: أكاديمية الفنون التقليدية) is an art school in Casablanca, Morocco. It focuses on preserving the traditional arts and crafts in Morocco. It was founded in 2012 and it's located at the Hassan II Mosque complex.

== History ==
The Academy of Traditional Arts was founded in 2012, as an expansion to the Hassan II Mosque complex, which already contained a mosque, a Quranic school, a library, and a museum. The creation of the academy was one of the major actions taken by King Mohamed VI showing his interest in Moroccan heritage and traditional arts.

The first class graduated in 2015 with 99 students (28 female). The new graduates had the chance to apply for governmental jobs as well as start their own startups with the help of special loans.

== Curriculum ==
The academy's faculty, including master artisans and a highly qualified instructors, come from all over Morocco and the world. They offer the students the chance an opportunity to learn from the best through theory and practice. Upon completion of course requirements, students are invited to present research and artwork in their respective fields.

Studies in the academy span for 3 years except for calligraphy (2 years), There are 5 main departments that offer 10 different crafts: carved wood, ironwork, jewelry, painted wood, carved plaster, leather work, stonemasonry, zellige, traditional weaving, and calligraphy.

To apply, students are invited to send a portfolio. The first selection is done based on the students' artistic works and interest in the field. The selected students are invited to take an entry exam and an interview. They can afterward choose to specialize in one of the crafts based on exam grades.

== Events and Publications ==
Every year the academy hosts a conference on a particular craft like woodworking, building restoration, or Islamic geometry. These conferences are attended by professionals, prominent researchers, and scholars, and often result in publications. So far, 5 books have been published and can be consulted at the school's library : Restauration des ornements du batiment traditionel, Tapis traditionnel: valeurs, histoire et restauration and Islamic Geometry are among the books published so far.

In 2019, The Academy partnered with the Farid Belkahia foundation to organize the first Traditional Arts award, to encourage young talent that showed innovation in their work, added a touch modernity, or made an effort to preserve the traditional craft.

== Traditional Arts Museum ==
In addition to the two floors of traditional craft classrooms and workshops, the Academy of Traditional Arts has a museum at the bottom floor. It showcases works from great craftsmen from all over Morocco. Originally intended for the Hassan II Mosque, these works in wood, zellige and stucco left unused are now showcased with a number of other calligraphy, bronze, and wood artifacts in a unique scenography. The museum offers step by step examples and videos that explain the process of creation of the art pieces. There is also a book that showcases all these in beautiful binding.
