= Miriam Soledad Raudez Rodríguez =

Nicaraguan politician

Miriam Soledad Raudez Rodríguez is a Nicaraguan politician who is currently serving as Minister of Education, Culture and Sports in the Government of Nicaragua.
