= Miriam Davoudvandi =

German music journalist and radio personality

Miriam Davoudvandi (born 1992 in Bucharest) is a German music journalist, radio personality, lecturer, podcaster, and author.

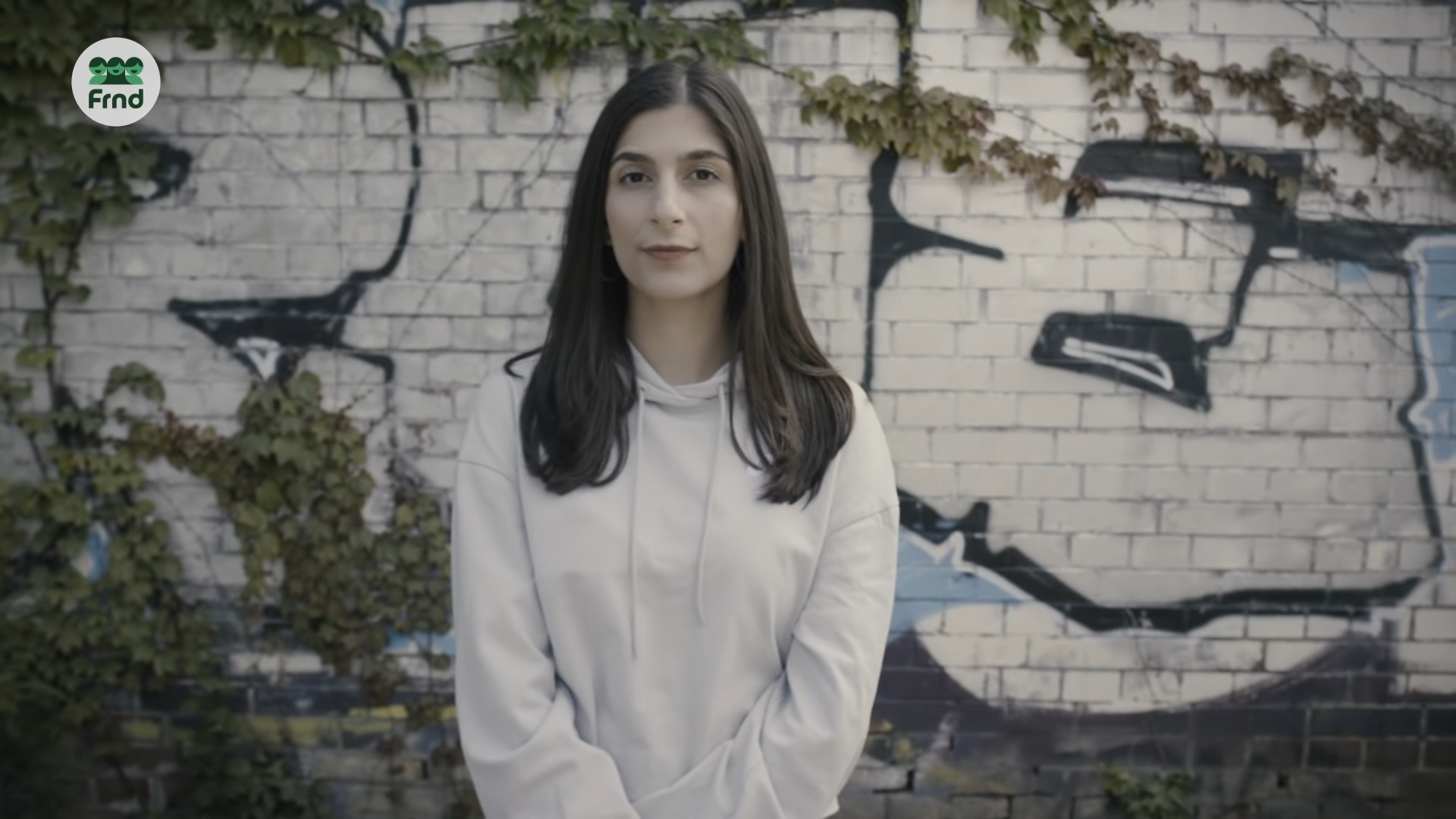
Davoudvandi in 2020

== Life ==
Davoudvandi grew up as the daughter of an Iranian father and a Romanian mother in Bucharest until the age of six. At the age of six, she moved to Bad Säckingen, where she grew up - in her own words - "very far from bourgeoisie". According to Davoudvandi, she has suffered from depressions since her youth. After graduating from high school, Davoudvandi moved to Frankfurt am Main and later studied Media, Communication and Political Science at the University of Leipzig. This was where her interest in feminist theory began.

After graduating, she worked as editor-in-chief of Splash! Mag. Until the end of Splash! Mag in 2019, she was the only female editor-in-chief of a (German) hip-hop medium. After the end of Splash! Mag, she wrote as a freelance journalist, mainly on themes like music, mental health and politics. She has written articles for Spiegel, Die Tageszeitung and Das Wetter and was a guest on Deutschlandfunk and NDR.

She has also worked as a workshop leader and as a DJ under the pseudonym Cashmiri. She gives lectures on rap and feminism. Since 2020, Davoudvandi has been working for the Cosmo (WDR) podcast Danke, gut. Der Podcast über Pop und Psyche, in which she talks to public figures about mental health. She hosts the documentary series Untergrund for the online music magazine Diffus.

In her book Das können wir uns nicht leisten. Was es bedeutet, in Deutschland arm zu sein, 'We cannot afford this. What it means to be poor in Germany' (2026), Davoudvandi concerns herself with poverty, work, and growing up in poor circumstances in Romania and Germany. Therein, she especially criticizes interpretations of poverty as a result of individual underperformance and juxtaposes in opposition a conjunction of personal experience and social analysis. By reference to her parents, she also describes occupational descents after migrating to Germany: Her father working as a house painter after an occupation as an aircraft technician, her mother as a housecleaner after having worked as a nurse.

Miriam Davoudvandi lives in Berlin.

== Reception ==
Philipp Bovermann of the Süddeutsche Zeitung sees Miriam Davoudvandi as one of the most important voices of a new, feminist and critical public within the rap scene. In her interviews with rappers, she also addresses their feelings, which is unusual for interviews of this kind. Davoudvandi tries to connect the two worlds of rap and feminism and is an "ambassador of sisterhood".
