= Meriem Beldi =

Algerian musician (born 1973)

Meriem Beldi مريم بلدي
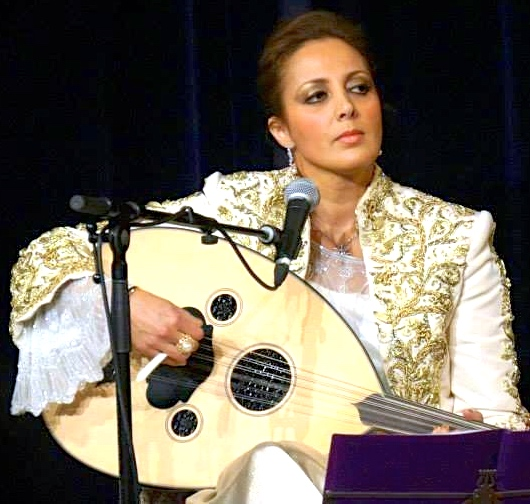

Background information
- Born: 20 December 1973 (age 52); Algiers, Algeria
- Genres: Andalusi classical music, chaabi
- Instrument: Oud
- Years active: 2001–present

Meriem Beldi (Arabic: مريم بلدي, born in Algiers) is an Algerian singer and oud player known for her interpretations of Andalusi classical music and Algerian chaabi.

== Life and career ==
Beldi comes from a family of Arab-Andalusian music lovers. At the age of six, she attended an Arab-Andalusi music concert with her mother, featuring Farid Bensensa, her future mentor. He later taught her music theory at the Moussilia El Djazairia music school in Algiers, whose other senior musicians were Sid Ahmed Serri and Sid Ali Benmerabet.

After a brief career as a flight attendant at Air Algérie, she recorded her first three albums. The first, entitled "Y'a Rache el faten", consists of two parts: "Inkilabet Zidane" in the musical style of Constantine, and the second entitled ''Nouba Hassine'' directed by Nacer Dhinne Benmerabet, recorded in the studio of Bouabdelah Zerouki. After a nine years artistic absence to raise a family, she returned with a new and third album "Zidane Nouba", which was recorded in Paris and released first in Algiers on 27 December 2014.

Beldi has participated as a singer in several concerts in Algeria and abroad, including two in 1998 at the Lisbon World Exhibition in Portugal and in 2003 during the Year of Algeria in France.

She has also recorded songs in the Algerian subgenre chaabi, which she performed in 2019 in Ivry-sur-Seine, France.

== Discography ==
- 2001 : Y'a Rache el faten
- 2002 : Nouba Hassine
- 2014 : Nouba Zidane
- 2019: Chaabi
