= Miriam Strunge =

German politician (born 1987)

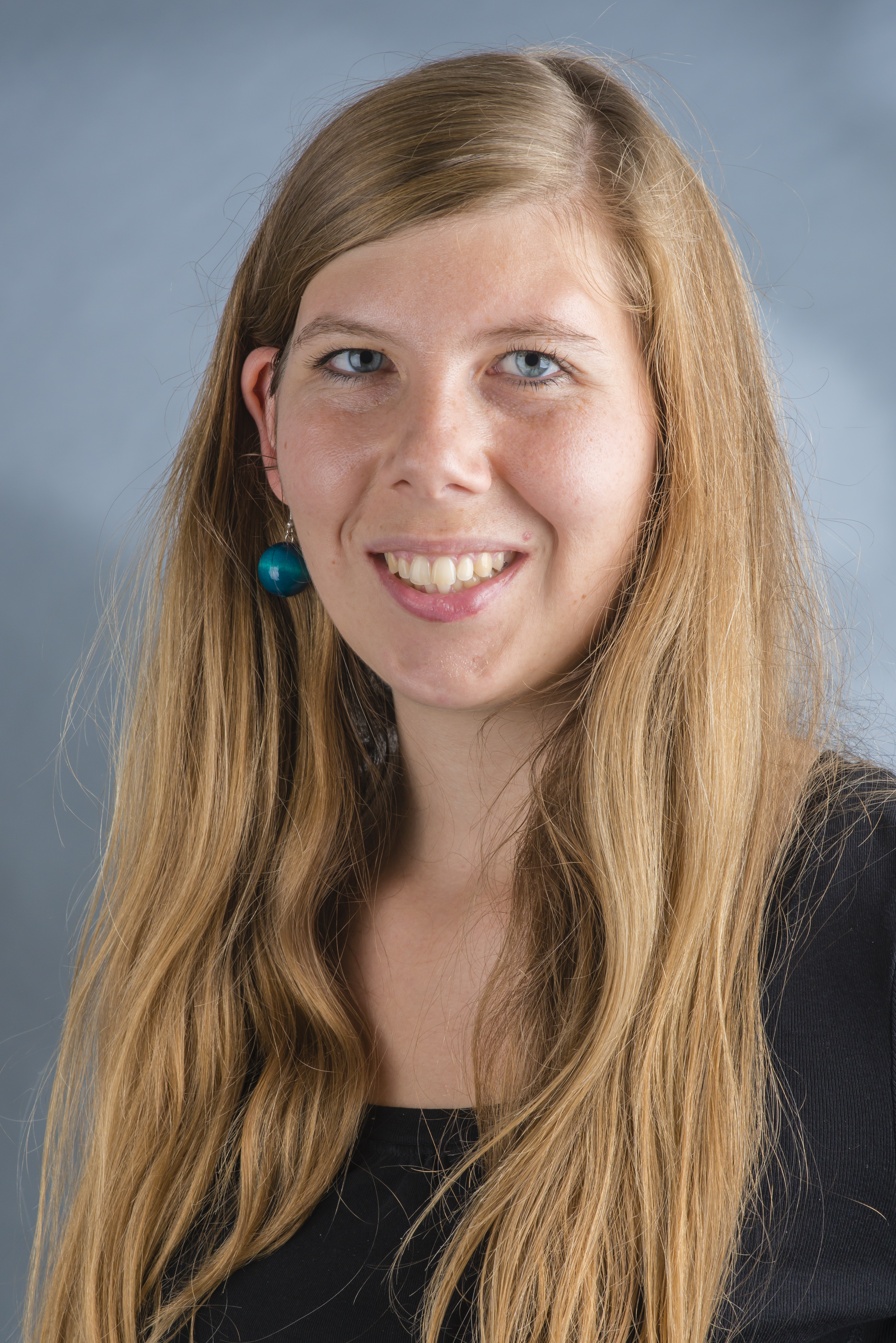
- Strunge in 2015

Member of the Bürgerschaft of Bremen
- Incumbent
- Assumed office 8 June 2015

Personal details
- Born: 26 August 1987 (age 39)
- Party: Die Linke

Miriam Strunge (born 26 August 1987) is a German politician serving as a member of the Bürgerschaft of Bremen since 2015. From 2013 to 2015, she served as co-spokesperson of the Left Youth Solid. From 2016 to 2018, she served as federal youth policy spokesperson of Die Linke.
