= Meryem Özyumşak =

Turkish footballer (born 1979)

Personal information
- Date of birth: 10 November 1979 (age 46)
- Place of birth: Adana, Turkey
- Position: Goalkeeper

Team information
- Current team: Adana İdman Yurdu

Youth career
- Adana İdman Yurdu

College career
Years	Team	Apps	(Gls)
1999–2003	Samsungücü		

Senior career*
Years	Team	Apps	(Gls)
- Ankara Gürtaşspor
1997–1998	Bursa Delphi Packard Spor		
2006–2007	Marmara Üniversitesispor		
2007–2008	Adana İdman Yurdu		
2008–2009	Sakarya Yenikent Güneşspor		
2009–2010	İzmit Belediyespor		
2010–2011	Adana İdman Yurdu		

International career^{‡}
1997	Turkey U19	1	(0)
2000–2010	Turkey	10	(0)

Managerial career
- 2016–: Adana İdman Yurdu
- * Club domestic league appearances and goals ‡ National team caps and goals as of 25 August 2010

Meryem Özyumşak (born 10 November 1979) is a Turkish football manager and former footballer. She was a member of the Turkey women's U19 and Turkey national teams.

== Private life ==
Meryem Özyumşak was born in Adana on 10 November 1979.

After completing her education at Ondokuz Mayıs University in Samsun, she began to work as a teacher for Physical Education.

== Club career ==
Inspired by her footballer brother, Özyumşak played football with boys in the school. She started her playing career with the support of her family at age 12 at Adana İdman Yurdu, the only women's football club in her hometown. She plays in the goalkeeper position.

Apart from Adana, she played for clubs in various cities such as in Ankara, Bursa, Samsun and Istanbul. She was with the clubs Ankara Gürtaşspor, Bursa Delphi Packard Spor (1997–98), Samsungücü, (1999–2003), Marmara Üniversitesispor (2006–07), Adana İdman Yurdu (2007–08), Sakarya Yenikent Güneşspor (2008–09) and İzmit Belediyespor (2009–10). She finally returned to her initial club Adana İdman Yurdu. After the 2002–03 season, she enjoyed the league champion title with her team Samsungücü.

She ended her active playing career at her hometown club Adana İdman Yurdu following the 2010-1 season.

== International career ==
Özyumşak was admitted to the Turkey U19 in 1997, and appeared in one match of the 1998 UEFA Women's Under-18 Championship qualifying roun. She took part at the 2005 Summer Universiade held in İzmir, Turkey.

She became a member of the Turkeu women's national team in 2000 and between 2006 and 2010, capping ten times. She played at the UEFA Women's Euro 2001 qualifying, and the UEFA Women's Support International Tournaments.

== Managerial career ==
In 2010, Özyumlak obtained an UEFA B coaching licance. She took part at a training course in Spain held by FC Barcelona.

She was appointed manager of her initial club Adana İdman Yurdu in the 2016-17 Turkish Women's First League. She has been managing the team since then.

== Managerial statistics ==
As of 23 January 2022

Team	From	To	Record				
Team	From	To	G	W	D	L	Win %
Adana İdman Yurdu
Adana İdman Yurdu	2016	2017	26	7	1	18	26.92
Adana İdman Yurdu	2017	2018	14	6	0	8	42.86
Adana İdman Yurdu	2018	2019	28	22	4	2	78.57
Adana İdman Yurdu	2019	2020	16	3	0	13	18.75
Adana İdman Yurdu	2020	2021	4	2	2	0	50.00
Adana İdman Yurdu	2021	2022	7	5	2	0	71.43
Total	2016	2022	95	45	9	41	47.37
Grand total	2016	2022	95	45	9	41	47.37

== Honours ==
Turkish Women's Football league

Samsungücü
Champions (1): 2002–03
