= Mirjam Müntefering =

German author and a lesbian (born 1969)

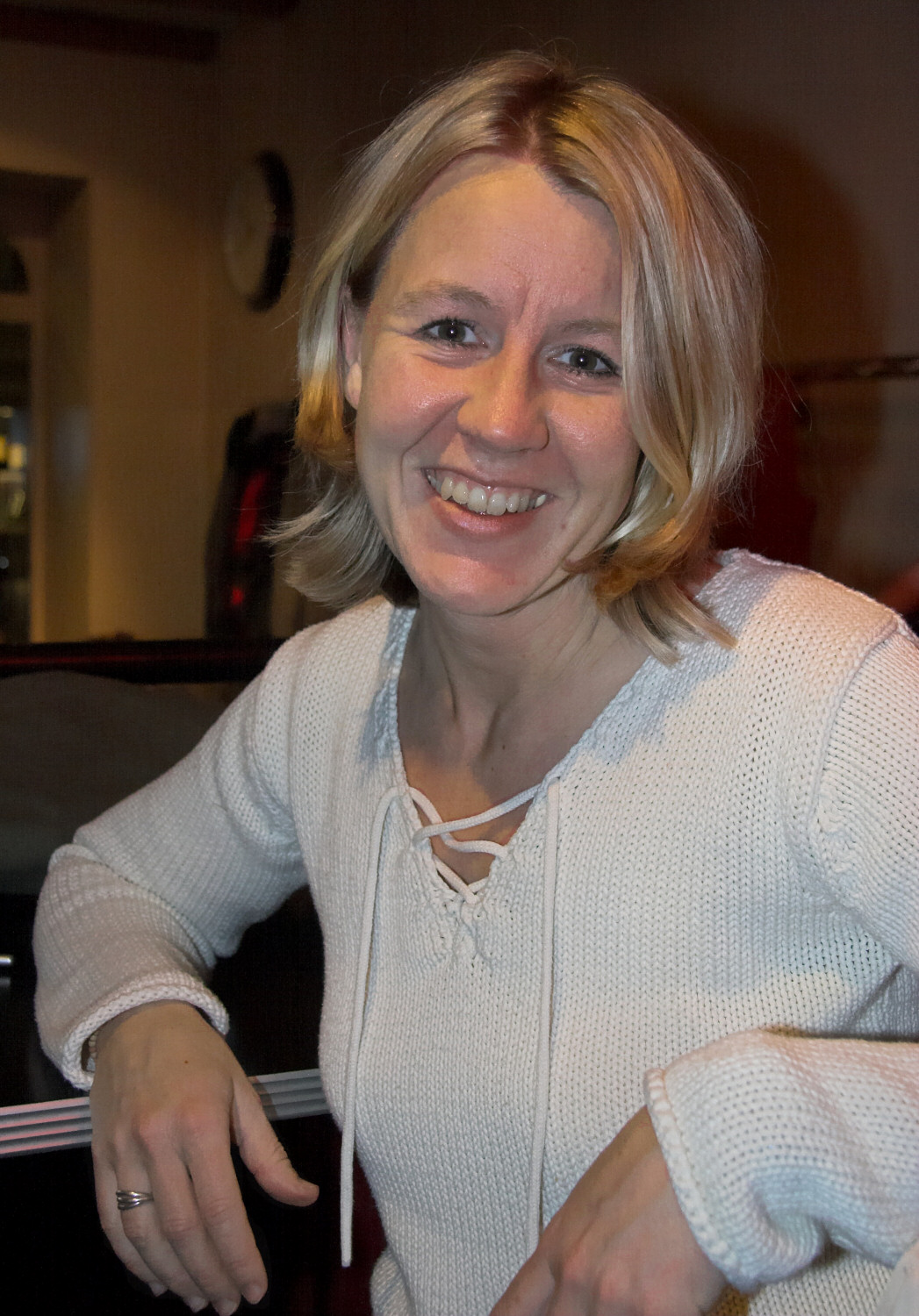
Mirjam Müntefering

Mirjam Müntefering (born January 29, 1969, in Arnsberg, North Rhine-Westphalia) is a German author and a lesbian.

She writes about LGBT themes, but also wrote a book on dog training. In 2000, she founded the dog obedience school "HUNDherum fit" in Hattingen. Müntefering is the daughter of Franz Müntefering.

== Books ==
- Welche Farbe auch immer oder das Blaue Gefühl (ISBN 3927075116)
- Ada sucht Eva, Lübbe 1998 (ISBN 3-404-12878-8)
- Katta at Frauenknast.de, dtv 2000 (ISBN 3-423-78152-1)
- Hund ist in. Das Hundebuch für die neue Generation, Kynos 2000 (ISBN 3-933228-27-1)
- Ein Stück meines Herzens, dtv 2001 (ISBN 3-423-70666-X)
- Die schönen Mütter anderer Töchter, Lübbe 2001 (ISBN 3-404-14557-7)
- Tatort Ruhrgebiet: Grubenhunde, Klopp 2003 (ISBN 3-7817-1364-4)
- Flug ins Apricot, Piper 2003 (ISBN 3-492-23802-5)
- Das Gegenteil von Schokolade, Lübbe 2003 (ISBN 3-404-14854-1)
- Verknallt in Camilla, Klopp 2004 (ISBN 3-7817-1365-2)
- Apricot im Herzen, Piper 2004 (ISBN 3-492238-03-3) (auch Milena 2001, ISBN 3-85286-085-7)
- Wenn es dunkel ist, gibt es uns nicht, Piper 2004 (ISBN 3-492-23957-9)
- Luna und Martje, Piper 2005 (ISBN 3-492-24342-8)
- Verknallt in den Traumprinzen!, Klopp 2005 (ISBN 3-7817-1366-0)
- Verknallt in Mister Perfect!, Klopp 2006 (ISBN 3-7817-1367-9)
- Emmas Story, Lübbe 2006 (ISBN 3-404-15480-0)
- Unversehrt Piper 2007 (ISBN 3-492-24869-1)
- Jetzt zu dritt, Lübbe 2007 (ISBN 3-404-15663-3)
- Tochter und viel mehr, Piper (forthcoming June) 2008 (ISBN 3-492-25128-5)
