= Myriam Sienra =

Paraguayan actress (1939–2020)

- Born: March 27, 1939; Concepción, Paraguay
- Died: December 10, 2020 (aged 81)
- Education: Silvio D’Amico Academy of Dramatic Arts
- Occupations: Actress and journalist
- Known for: Theatrical and film acting
- Awards: Oscar Trinidad (National Secretariat of Culture); Masters of Art (El Cabildo Cultural Center)

Myriam Sienra (Concepción, 27 March 1939 – 10 December 2020) was a Paraguayan actress and journalist who graduated from the Silvio D’Amico Academy of Dramatic Arts in Rome.

During her career, she performed more than 65 theatrical performances and various feature films. She received several national awards like "Masters of Art" by the El Cabildo Cultural Center in the "Theatre" category and the Oscar Trinidad by the National Secretariat of Culture.

== Artistic career ==
Sienra's artistic career included her performances as secondary and lead characters in nationally and internationally recognized films such as Miss Ameriguá (1994), O Toque do Oboé (1998), Miramenometokei (2003), and 7 Cajas (2012).

Some of her most recognized theater works included Velada de Aregúa (1974), La casa de Bernarda Alba (1983), Las troyanas (1984), Las vuidas (2015), Casi, casi una familia normal (2017), El hijo de la novia (2018).

She published four albums of poems and indigenous and Jewish music.

=== Positions ===
She was director of the Municipal Theater of Asunción "Ignacio A. Pane" and the General Director of the Institute of Fine Arts under the Ministry of Education and Culture.

In 1991, she was part of the Board of Directors of the Latin American Center for Theatrical Creation and Research in Paraguay.
