= Silicon Valley (disambiguation) =

Silicon Valley is the nickname for the high-tech industrial hub in the San Francisco Bay Area in California, United States.

Silicon Valley may also refer to:

== Places ==
- Silicon Valley of China (disambiguation)
- Silicon Valley of Turkey, proposed project for the Turkish version of the Silicon Valley
- Silicon Valley North, used to describe Ottawa, Canada, during the dot com boom of the 1990s

== Other uses ==
- Silicon Valley (TV series), 2014 American television sitcom
- Space Station Silicon Valley, a console game
- Silicon Valley Computer Group Philippines, a computer retail store in the Philippines

== See also ==
- German Silicon Valley (disambiguation)
- Russian Silicon Valley (disambiguation)
- Silicon Alley, an area with a high concentration of high-tech industries in New York City
- Silicone Valley, a nickname for the San Fernando Valley, the center of the U.S. pornographic industry
- Silicon Wadi, an area with a high concentration of high-tech industries in Israel
- List of technology centers, some of which have derivative names such as "Iran's Silicon Valley"
