= Güllük (disambiguation) =

Güllük is a town in Muğla Province, Turkey.

Güllük may also refer to:

- Güllük, Azerbaijan, a village in Qakh Rayon
- Güllük Gulf, an Aegean gulf of Turkey
- Güllük, Kulp
- Güllük Dağı (Mount Güllük), a mountain in Turkey in the Mount Güllük-Termessos National Park

== See also ==
- Güllük Port
