= Güllük Port =

- Click on the map for a fullscreen view

Location
- Location: Güllük, Muğla, Turkey
- Coordinates: 37°15′14.25″N 27°36′21.51″E
- UN/LOCODE: TRGUL

Details
- Opened: 2006; 19 years ago
- Operated by: Güllük Port
- Size: 18.0 ha (44 acres)

Güllük Port is a port with an annual capacity of 5 million tons which serves ships up to 50.000 dwt tons at Güllük, Muğla, Turkey.

== Geography ==
The 18.0 ha (44 acres) port is at the northern part of Güllük. Its altitude is 0 m (0 ft). It is surrounded by Aegean Sea to the west, and forest to the north.

== History ==
In late 19’s new strategic plan was developed by the Turkish government to increase the port capacity of Turkey. Part of this strategic plan world known Turkish architect Günay Erdem and famous Turkish landscape architect Sunay Erdem prepared design for the new port in 2004. Same year construction of Güllük Port begun and in 2006 it was opened to public.
