= Elazığ Culture Park =

Park in Elazığ, Turkey

- Elazığ Kültür Park
- Interactive map of Elazığ Culture Park
- Location: Elazığ, Turkey
- Coordinates: 38°40′16.56″N 39°12′13.80″E
- Area: 24.5 ha (61 acres)
- Created: 2015; 11 years ago
- Designer: Günay Erdem, Serpil Öztekin Erdem
- Operator: Elaziğ Municipality

Elazığ Culture Park (Turkish: Elazığ Kültür Park) is a public park in Elazığ, a city in the Eastern Anatolia region of Turkey. The park is counted as one of the largest parks in the region.

== Geography ==
The 24.5 ha (61 acres) park is at the eastern part of the center of Elazığ. Its altitude is 1,060 m (3,480 ft). It is surrounded by City Stadium to the west, Zafran Mesire Alanı to the north, 8th General Directorate of High Ways to the east and, Olgunlar District to the south.

== History ==
During the early years of the Turkey, the site was used as a city nursery. As the growth of the city of Elazığ step by step site surrounded by the high density residential buildings. At 2010 Municipality of Elazığ took the site and established Elazığ Culture Park and opened to the public on 29 May 2015, the Conquest Day of İstanbul.

== Design ==
Designers of Elazığ Culture Park are world known Turkish architect Günay Erdem together with famous Turkish landscape architects Serpil Öztekin Erdem and Sunay Erdem.
