= Teos Marina =

Marina in İzmir, Turkey

- Seferihisar
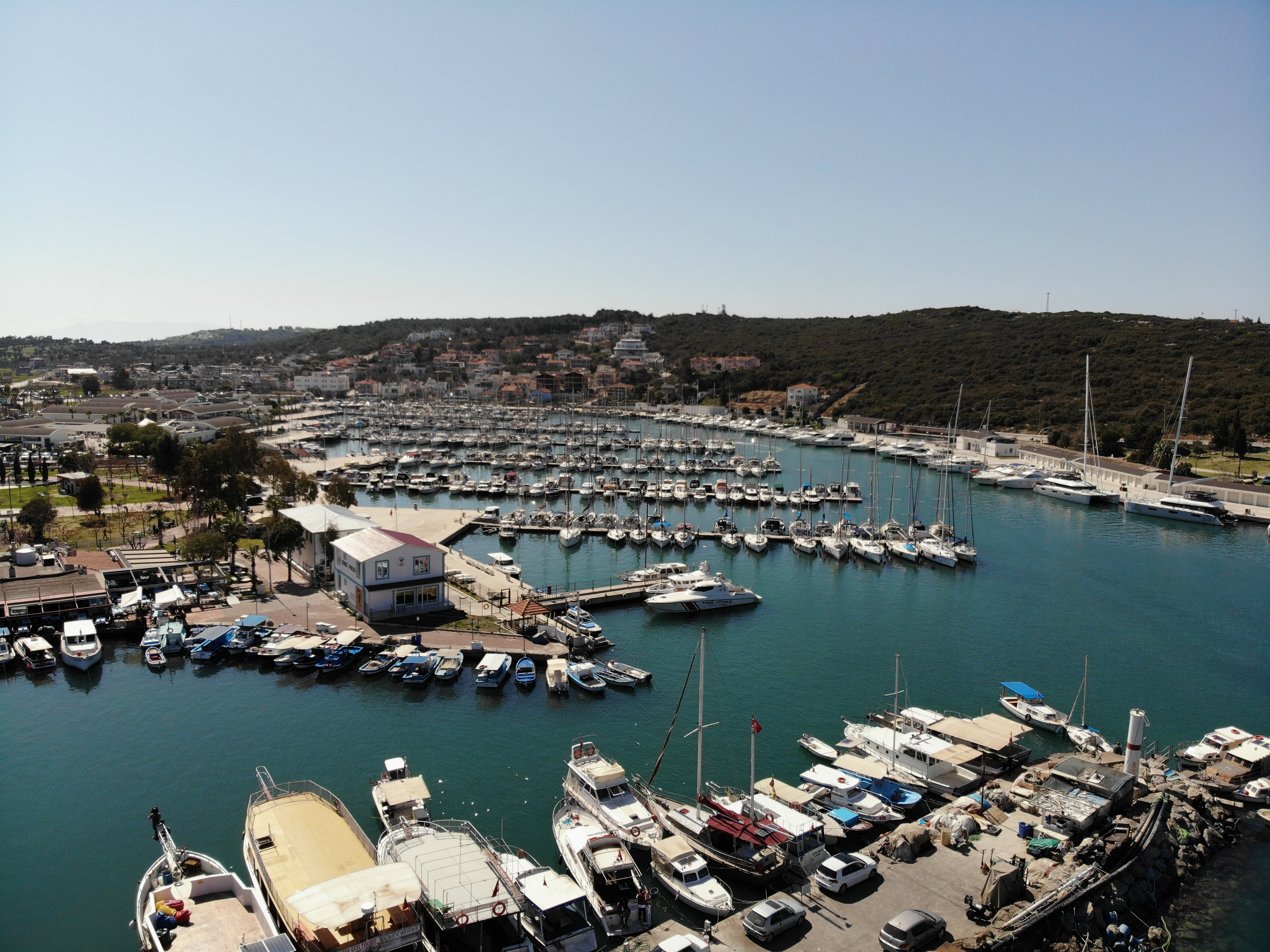
- Interactive map of Teos Marina
- Location: Seferihisar, İzmir, Turkey
- Coordinates: 38°11′34.00″N 26°46′59.00″E
- Area: 21.0 ha (52 acres)
- Created: 2010; 16 years ago
- Designer: Günay Erdem, Sunay Erdem
- Operator: Teos Marina

Teos Marina is a marina with a capacity of 480 boats at sea, 80 boats on land and 30 that can be moored at channel docks in Seferihisar, İzmir, Turkey.

== Geography ==
The 21.0 ha (52 acres) marina is at the western part of Seferihisar. Its altitude is 0 m (0 ft). It is surrounded by forest to the west, Aegean Sea and Seferihisar Castle to the north, Seferihisar City Center to the east and south.

== History ==
Seferihisar was always used as a port. In late 19’s new strategic plan was developed by the Turkish government to increase the marina capacity of Turkey. Part of this strategic plan world known Turkish architect Günay Erdem and famous Turkish landscape architect Sunay Erdem prepared design for the new port and as a result new Teos Marina emerged. Same year construction of Teos Marina begun and in 2010 was opened to public.
