= Karabük University Square =

Park in Karabük, Turkey

- Karabük Üniversitesi Meydanı
- Interactive map of Karabük University Square
- Location: Karabük, Turkey
- Coordinates: 41°12′56.11″N 32°39′06.98″E
- Area: 36.0 ha (89 acres)
- Created: 2011; 15 years ago
- Designer: Günay Erdem, Sunay Erdem, Serpil Öztekin Erdem
- Operator: Karabük University

Karabük University Square (Turkish: Karabük Üniversitesi Meydanı) is the first urban design project in Karabük, Turkey.

== Geography ==
The 36.0 ha (89 acres) University Square is located at the edge of Araç Çayı, very close to the main entrance of the Karabük University campus. Its altitude is 294 m (965 ft). A square connects the whole university buildings and provides environment for the social life at campus.

== History ==
At 2010 urban design projects were prepared. Application of the projects was executed by the Karabük University at 2011 and opened to the public the same year.

== Design ==
Designers of the University Square are Turkish architects Günay Erdem, Sunay Erdem and Serpil Öztekin Erdem.
