= Elazığ Education Campus =

Elazig Education Campus
- Elazığ Eğitim Kampüsü
- Interactive map of Elazig Education Campus
- Location: Elazığ, Turkey
- Coordinates: 38°38′59.92″N 39°12′34.96″E
- Area: 22 ha (54 acres)
- Created: 2013; 13 years ago

Elazığ Education Campus is an educational complex in Elazığ, Turkey

== Concept and Design ==
Elazığ Education Campus located in Elazığ Turkey will be the biggest campus in central and eastern regions of Turkey. World-known Turkish architect Günay Erdem and world-known landscape architect Sunay Erdem with the support of landscape architect Serpil Öztekin Erdem developed the design for the campus.

== Quick facts ==
- Total Plot Area: 220,000 m^{2}
- Total Buildings Area: 120,000 m^{2}
- Functions: classroom, common education area, forum, laboratory, library, administrative unit, stadium, sports center, indoor swimming pool, dormitory, amphitheater, refectory, student clubs area, mosque, kindergarten
- Project Cost: $50 million
- Population: 10.000 students
