= Karabük University Stadium =

Stadium in Karabük, Turkey

- Karabük Üniversitesi Stadyumu
- Interactive map of Karabük University Stadium
- Location: Karabük, Turkey
- Coordinates: 41°12′19.68″N 32°39′24.44″E
- Area: 36.0 ha (89 acres)
- Created: 2013; 13 years ago
- Operator: Karabük University

Karabük University Stadium (Turkish: Karabük Üniversitesi Stadı) is the biggest urban design project in Karabük, Turkey.

== Geography ==
The 122000 sm Karabük University Stadium is located at the end and upper part of the campus. Its altitude changes between 326 m (1,070 ft) and 362 m (1,188 ft). Stadium has a panoramic view to the whole Karabük.

== History ==
In 2012 urban design projects were prepared. Application of the projects was executed by the Karabük University at 2013 and opened to the public the same year.

== Design ==
Crescent and star idea emerged from landscape architect Sunay Erdem, design was developed by architect Günay Erdem and all technical details were developed by landscape architect Serpil Öztekin Erdem.
