= Bingöl University =

Public university in Bingöl, Turkey

Coordinates: 38.8852°N 40.5057°E

- Bingöl Üniversitesi
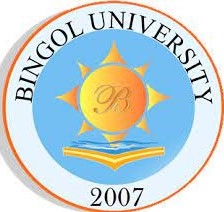
- Motto: "Science and Culture Sun"
- Type: Public University
- Established: 2007
- Affiliations: Erasmus Programme
- Rector: Prof. Dr. İbrahim Çapak
- Faculty: 10
- Administrative staff: 1245
- Students: 15000+
- Location: Selahaddin-i Eyyubi Mah. Aydınlık Cad. No:1, Bingöl, Turkey
- Website: Official website

Bingöl University (Turkish: Bingöl Üniversitesi) is a university located in Bingöl, Turkey. It was established in 2007. The University is led by Prof. Dr. İbrahim Çapak. Bingol University, Web of Science database, according to 2019 data, 108 state universities in terms of number of publications per faculty member in Turkey has a performance ranking #6 ranking.

== History ==
Bingol University was founded as an institution which contributes to the higher education in the Turkish Republic. Initially the university consisted of 3 faculties, 2 institutes, and 2 vocational schools. Later on, the university expanded its activities to 10 faculties, 6 vocational schools, and 5 institutes. At the university, over 15'000 alumni attend classes at the undergraduate, bachelor and graduate level.

In 2011, the whole Bingöl University campus was redesigned by Günay Erdem, landscape architect Serpil Öztekin Erdem and landscape architect Sunay Erdem, and took its current state.

== Faculties ==
- Faculty of Sciences and Letters
- Faculty of Economics and administrative Sciences
- Faculty of Theology
- Faculty of Engineering and Architecture
- Faculty of Agriculture
- Faculty of Veterinary Medicine
- Faculty of Arts and Sciences
- Faculty of Health Sciences
- Faculty of Sports Science

== Institutes ==
- Institute of Sciences
- Institute of Health Sciences
- Institute of Social Sciences
- Institute of Living Languages Sciences
- Institute of Recitat

== Vocational schools ==
- Food, Agriculture and Livestock School
- Genç Vocational School
- Health Services Vocational School
- Solhan Health Services Vocational School
- Technical Science Vocational School
- Social Sciences Vocational School

== Affiliations ==
The university is a member of the Caucasus University Association.
