= Iasos =

Greek city in ancient Caria

- Ἰασός or Ἰασσός (Greek)
- Iassos
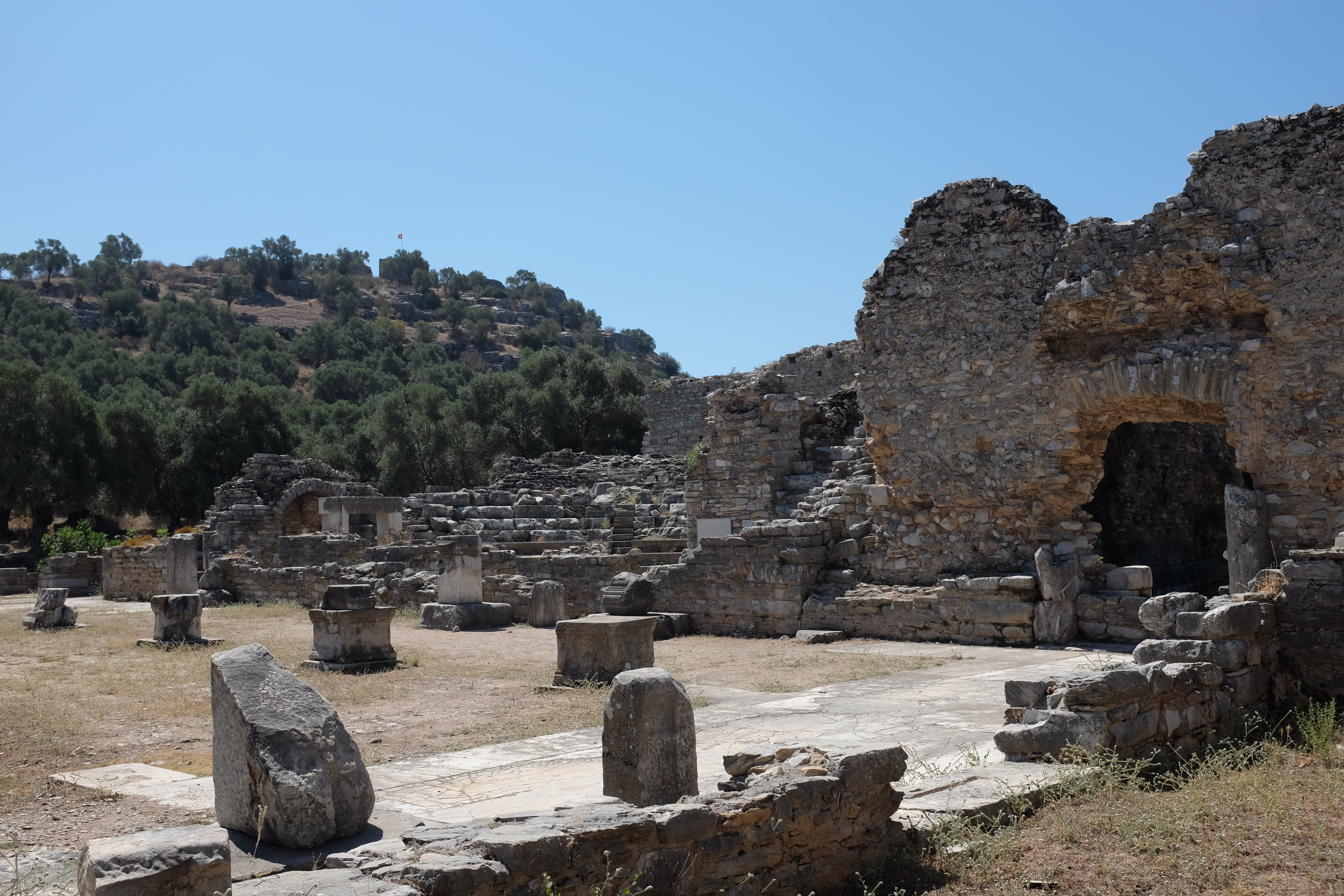
- The hill with the acropolis, the bouleuterion (center) and a Hellenistic tower (right) near the agora of Iasos.

- Location within Turkey
- 37°16′40″N 27°35′11″E
- Type: Settlement
- Location: Kıyıkışlacık, Muğla Province, Turkey
- Region: Caria

Iasos or Iassos (/ˈaɪəˌsɒs/; Greek: Ἰασός Iasós or Ἰασσός Iassós), also in Latinized form Iasus or Iassus (/ˈaɪəsəs/), was a Greek city in ancient Caria located on the Gulf of Iasos (now called the Gulf of Güllük), opposite the modern town of Güllük, Turkey. It was originally on an island, but is now connected to the mainland. It is located in the Milas district of Muğla Province, Turkey, near the Alevi village of Kıyıkışlacık, about 31 km from the center of Milas.

== History ==
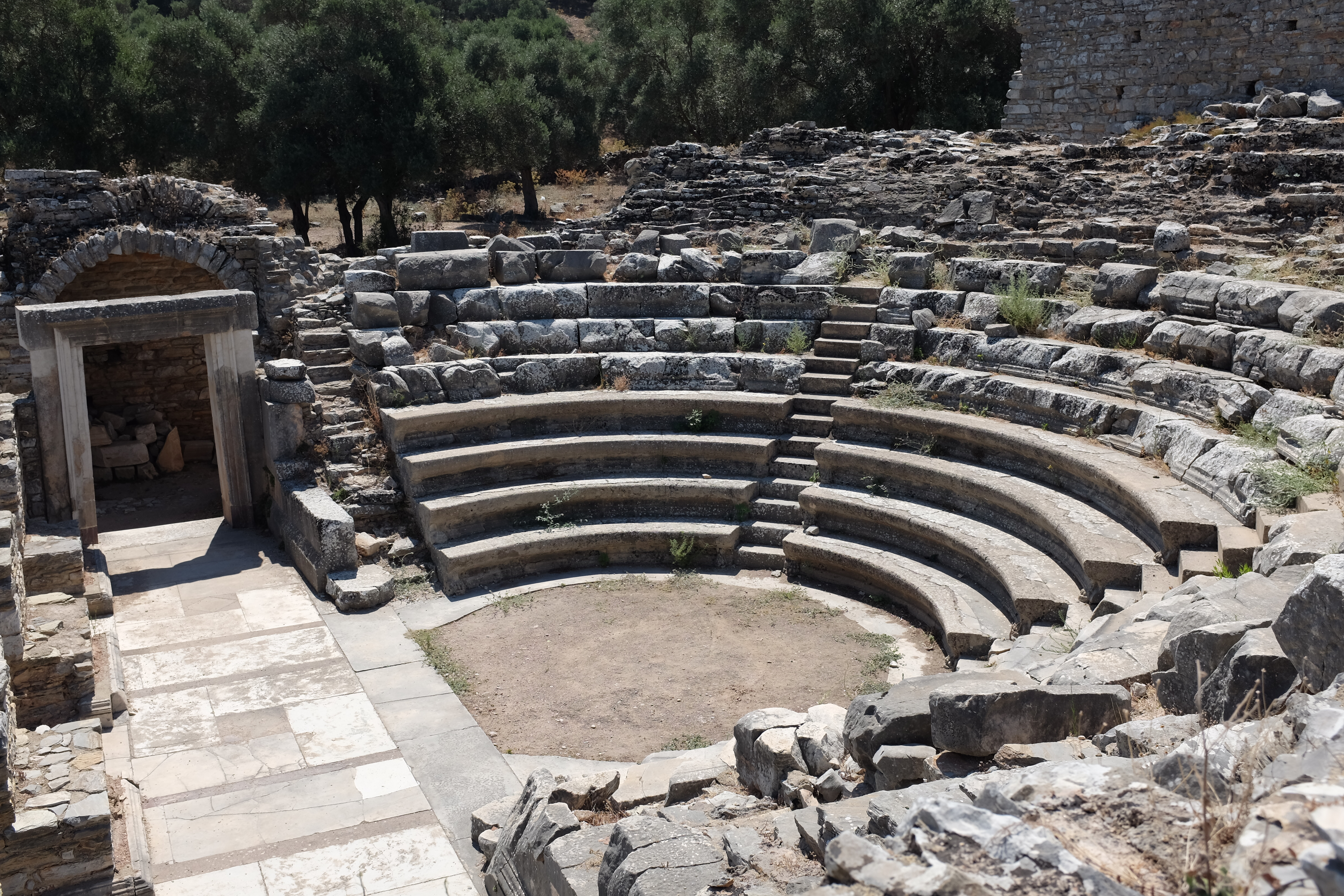
Interior of bouleuterion

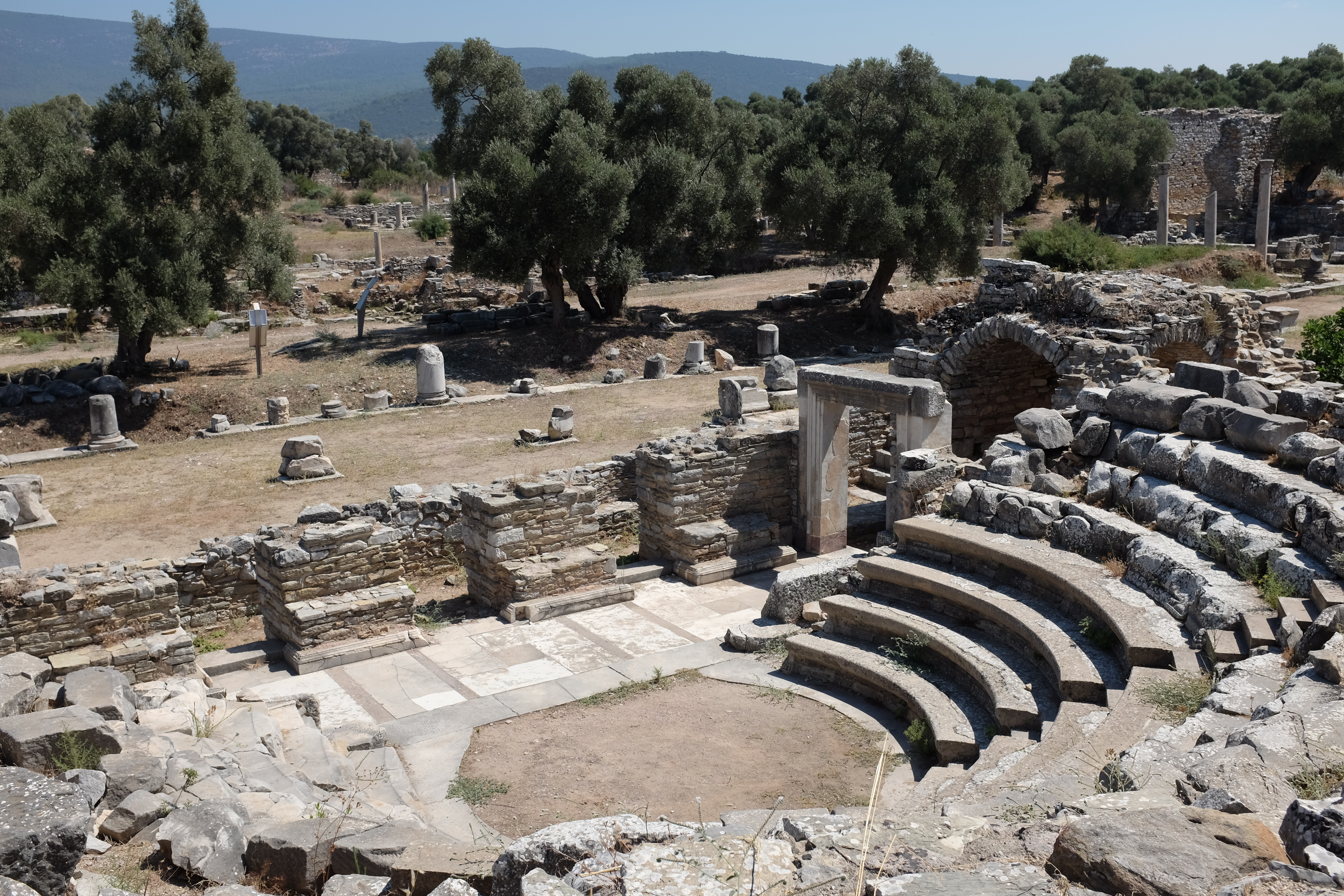
View of agora from bouleuterion

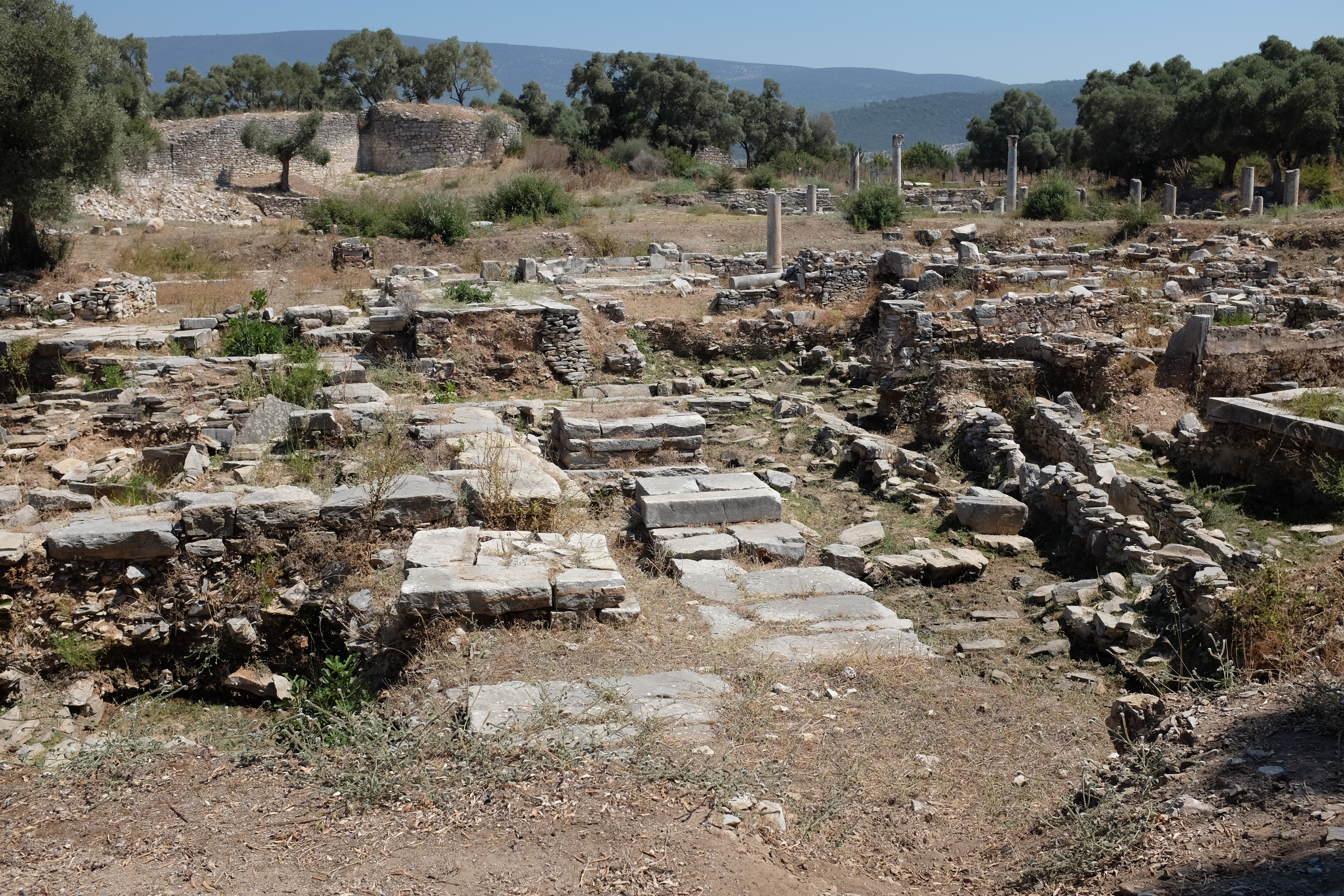
Ruins on the agora, possibly from the basilica

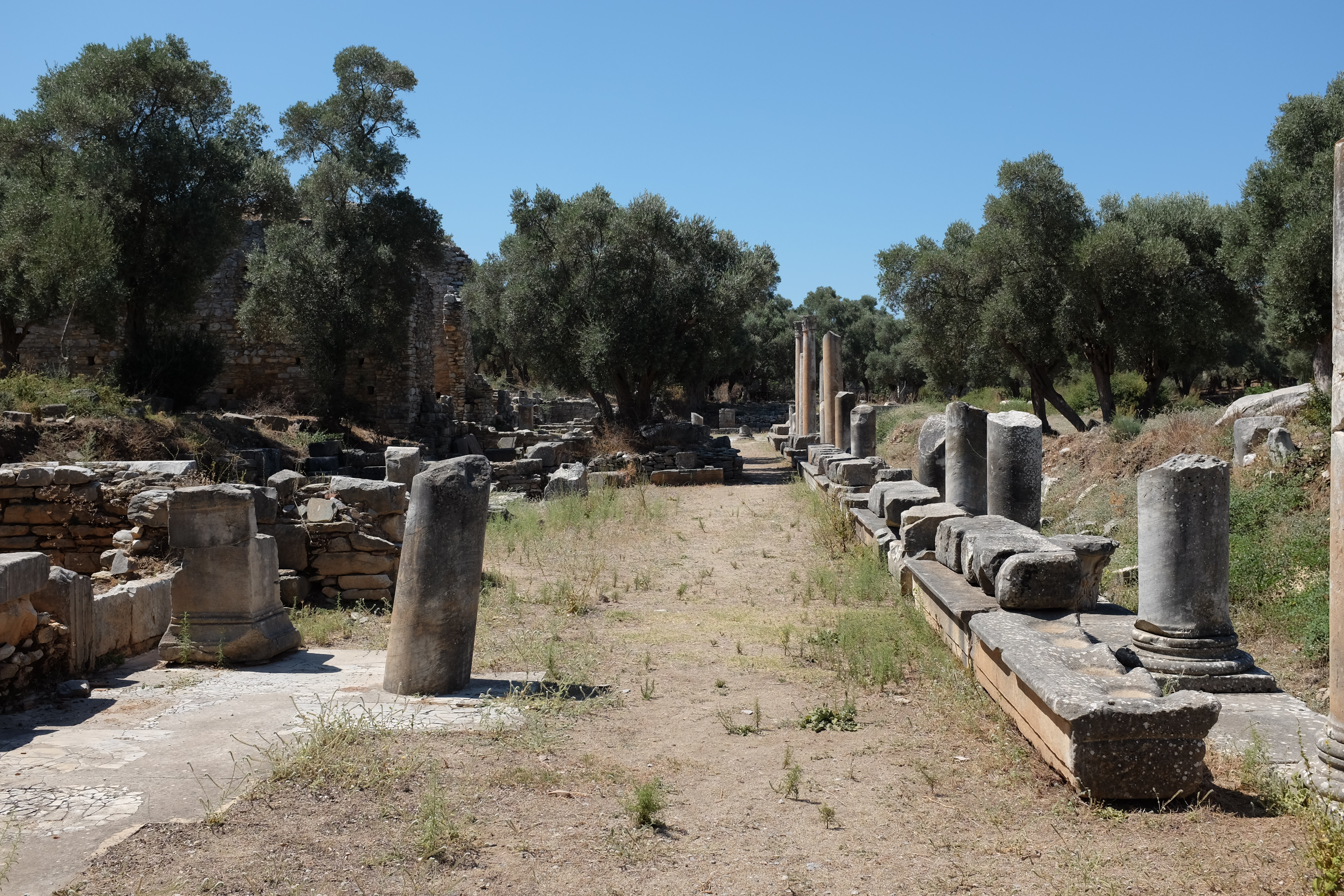
Portico on eastern side of agora, looking south

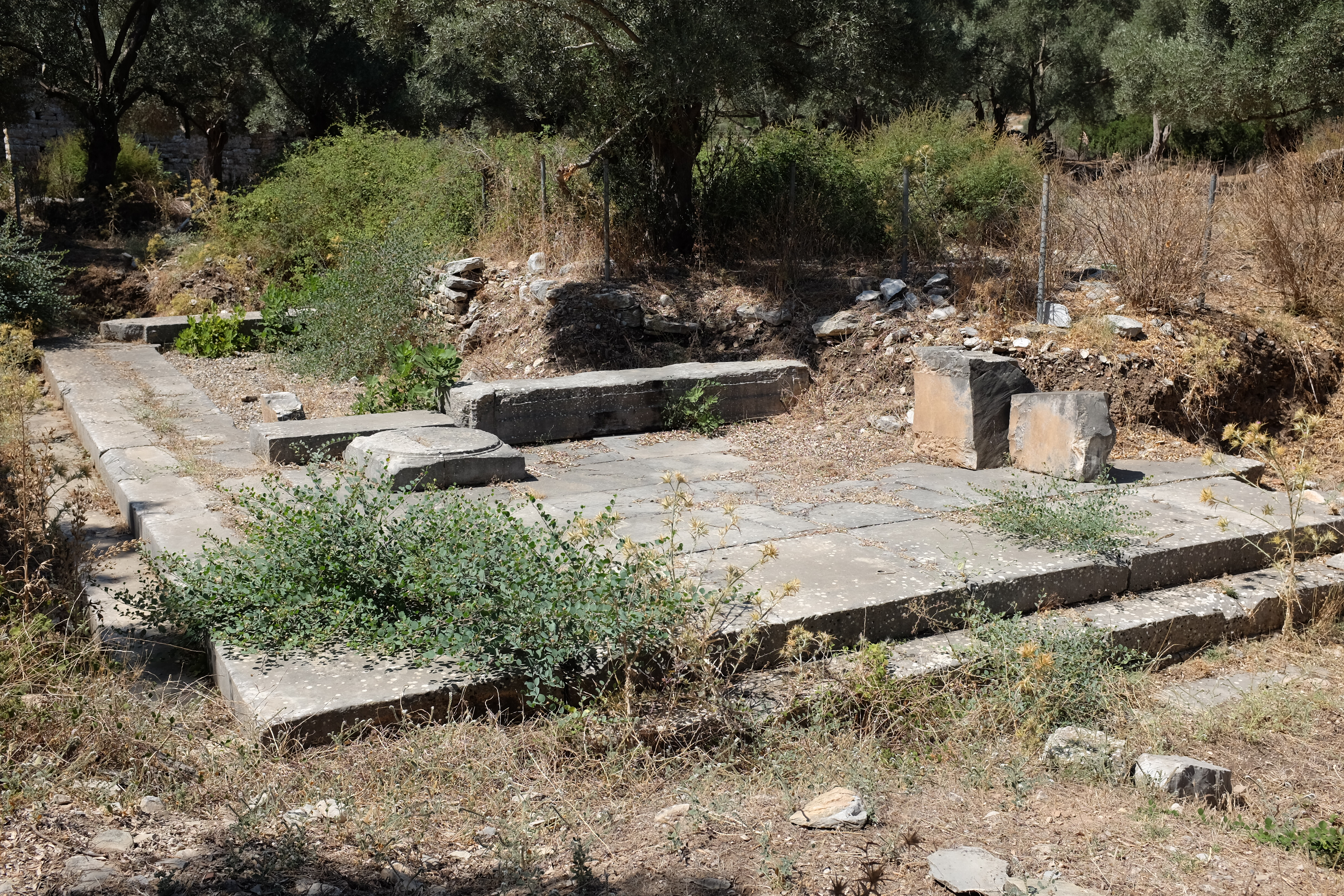
Sanctuary of Artemis Astias

Ancient historians consider Iasos a colonial foundation of Argos, but archaeology shows a much longer history. According to the ancient reports, the Argive colonists had sustained severe losses in a war with the native Carians, so they invited the son of Neleus, who had previously founded Miletus, to come to their assistance. The town appears on that occasion to have received additional settlers. The town, which appears to have occupied the whole of the little island, had only ten stadia in circumference; but it nevertheless acquired great wealth, from its fisheries and trade in fish.

Iasos was a member of the Delian League and was involved in the Peloponnesian War (431–404 BC). After the Sicilian expedition of the Athenians, Iasos was attacked by the Spartans and their allies; it was governed at the time by Amorges, a Persian chief, who had revolted from Darius II. It was taken by the Spartans, who captured Amorges and delivered him up to Tissaphernes. The town itself was plundered on that occasion. It became part of the Hecatomnid satrapy in the 4th century and was conquered by Alexander. We afterwards find it besieged by Philip V, king of Macedon, who, however, was compelled by the Romans to restore it to Ptolemy V of Egypt.

The mountains in the neighbourhood of Iasus furnished a beautiful kind of marble, of a blood-red and livid white colour, which was used by the ancients for ornamental purposes. Near the town was a sanctuary of Hestia, with a statue of the goddess, which, though standing in the open air, was believed never to be touched by the rain. The same story is related, by Strabo, of a temple of Artemis in the same neighbourhood. Iasus, as a celebrated fishing place, is alluded to by Athenaeus. The place is still existing, under the name of Askem or Asýn Kalessi. Chandler (Travels in As. Min. p. 226) relates that the island on which the town was built is now united to the mainland by a small isthmus. Part of the city walls still exist, and are of a regular, solid, and handsome structure. In the side of the rock a theatre with many rows of seats still remains, and several inscriptions and coins have been found there.

It seems to have been abandoned in about the 15th–16th century, in the Ottoman period, when a small town was founded nearby named Asin Kale or Asin Kurin, in the sanjak of Menteşe within the vilayet of İzmir.

== Archaeology ==
Preliminary research was done by the French archaeologist Charles Texier in 1835. A number of ancient Greek inscriptions were removed from the site which were later donated to the British Museum by the Duke of St Albans. Since then, Iasos and the necropolis have been under regular scientific excavations on behalf of the Italian School of Archaeology at Athens by Doro Levi (1960–1972), Clelia Laviosa (1972–1984) and Fede Berti (1984–2011). From 2011 till 2013 the Director of Iasos excavations has been Marcello Spanu .

The site of Iasos has been settled continuously since the Early Bronze Age. In early times, Iasos was influenced by the culture of the Cyclades islands.

During the 1970s, archaeological excavations at Iasus revealed Mycenean buildings (with two "Minoan" levels underneath them).

"At Iasus, Mycenaean buildings, approximately dated by the presence of LH IIIa ware, have been found below the protogeometric cemetery. Below this again two 'Minoan' levels are reported, the earlier containing local imitations of MM II-LM I ware, the later imported pieces of the Second Palace Period (AJA [1973], 177-8). Middle and Late Minoan ware has also occurred at Cnidus (AJA [1978], 321)."

Other archaeological finds cover Geometric, Hellenistic and Roman periods, through the Byzantine period.

Outstanding remains in Iasos include an Artemis stoa and Roman villas.

== Church history ==
Four of its bishops are known: Themistius in 421, Flacillus in 451, David in 787, and Gregory in 878 (Michel Le Quien, Oriens Christianus I:913). The see is mentioned in the Nova Tactica, 10th century (Heinrich Gelzer, Georgii Cyprii descriptio orbis romani, nos. 340, 1464), and more recently in the Notitiae Episcopatuum.

Iasus is listed among the titular sees of Caria in the Annuario Pontificio. The titular see has had the following Bishops:

- Bishop Salvador Martinez Silva (1940.08.10 – 1969.02.07)
- Bishop Antonio Laubitz (1924.11.08 – 1939.05.17)
- Bishop Gregorio Ignazio Romero (1899.06.19 – 1915.02.21)
- Bishop John Joseph Keane (later Archbishop) (1888.08.12 – 1897.01.29)
- Bishop Gaetano d'Alessandro (later Archbishop) (1884.03.24 – 1888.03.18)
- Bishop Étienne-Louis Charbonnaux, M.E.P. (1844.07.08 – 1873.06.23)
- Bishop Ernst Maria Ferdinand von Bissingen-Nieppenburg (1801.12.23 – 1820.03.12)
- Bishop Emanuel Maria Graf Thun (1797.07.24 – 1800.08.11)
- Bishop-elect Bartolome Gascon (1727.03.17 – ?)

== Notable people ==
- Choerilus of Iasus (4th century BC), an epic poet who accompanied Alexander the Great.

== Gallery ==
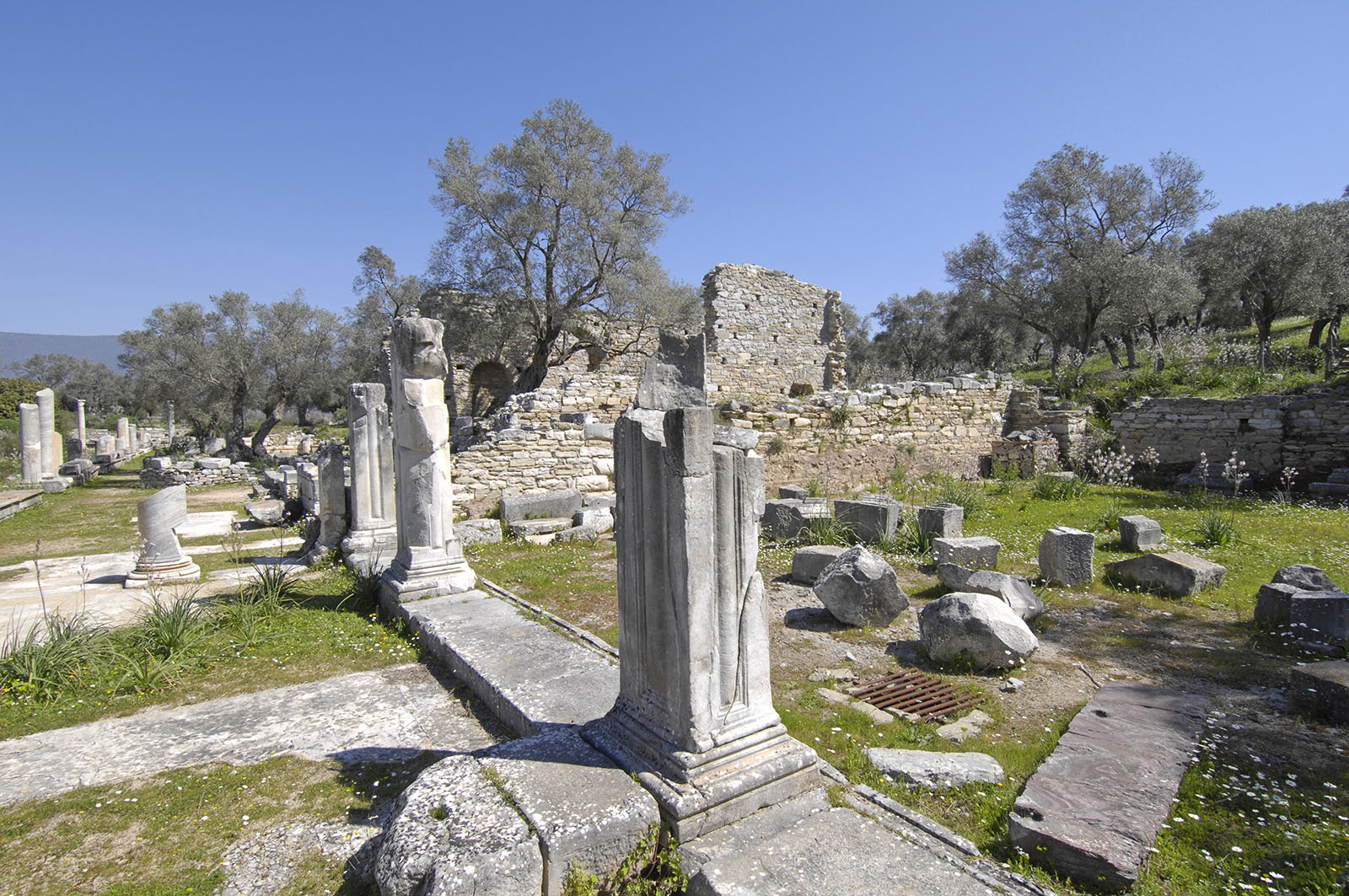
Iasos Agora

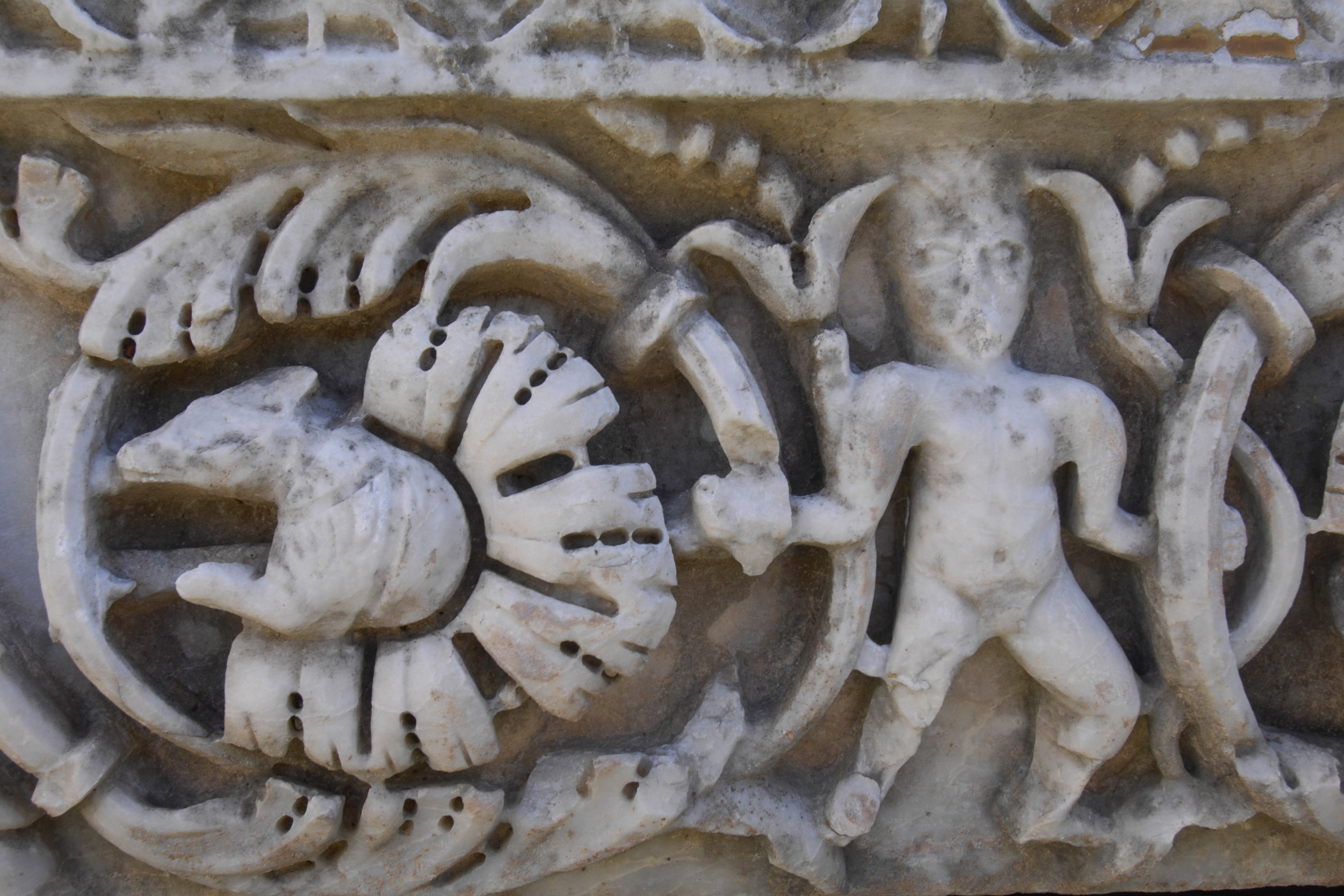
Iasos Agora Frieze

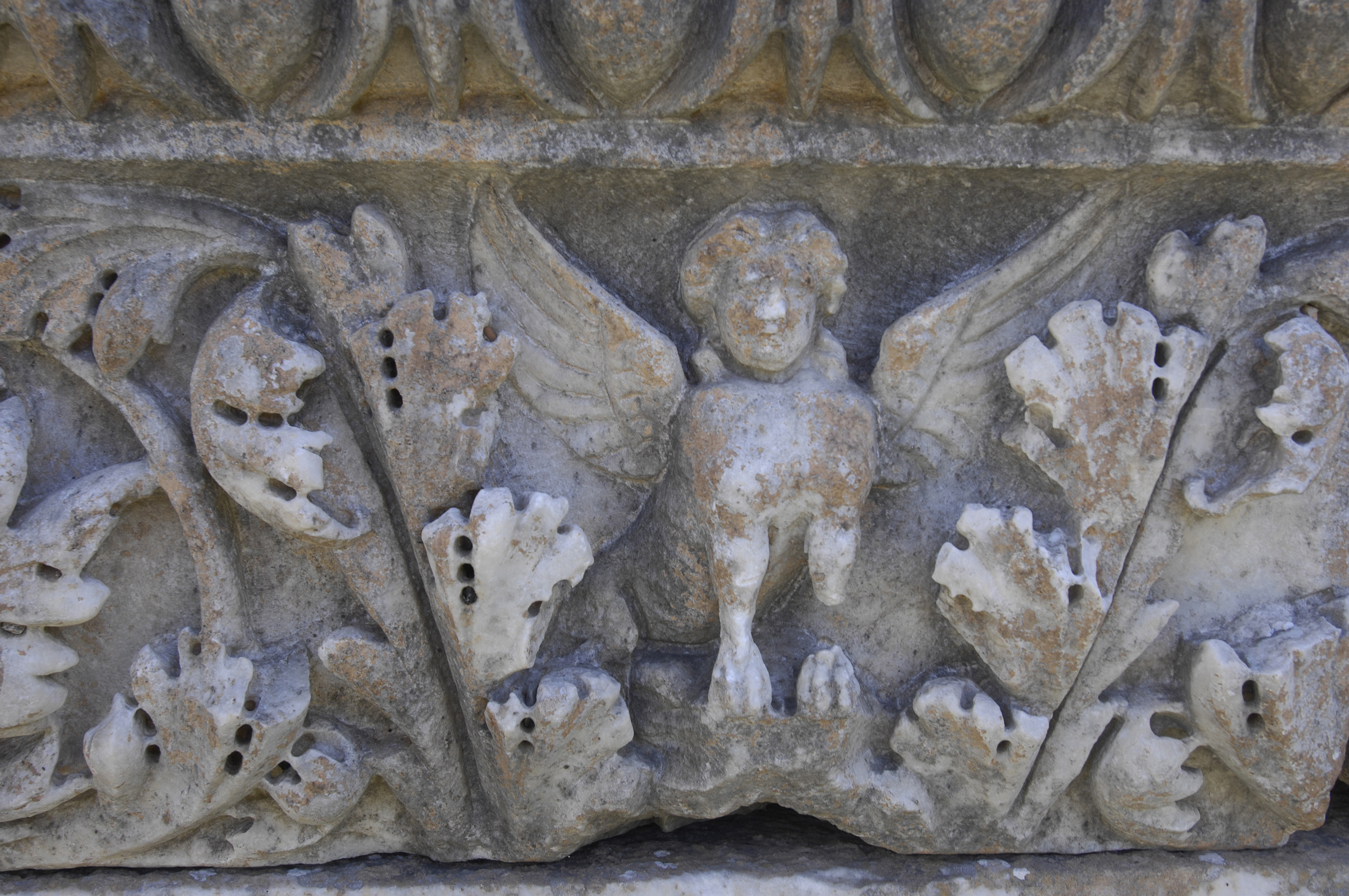
Iasos Agora Frieze

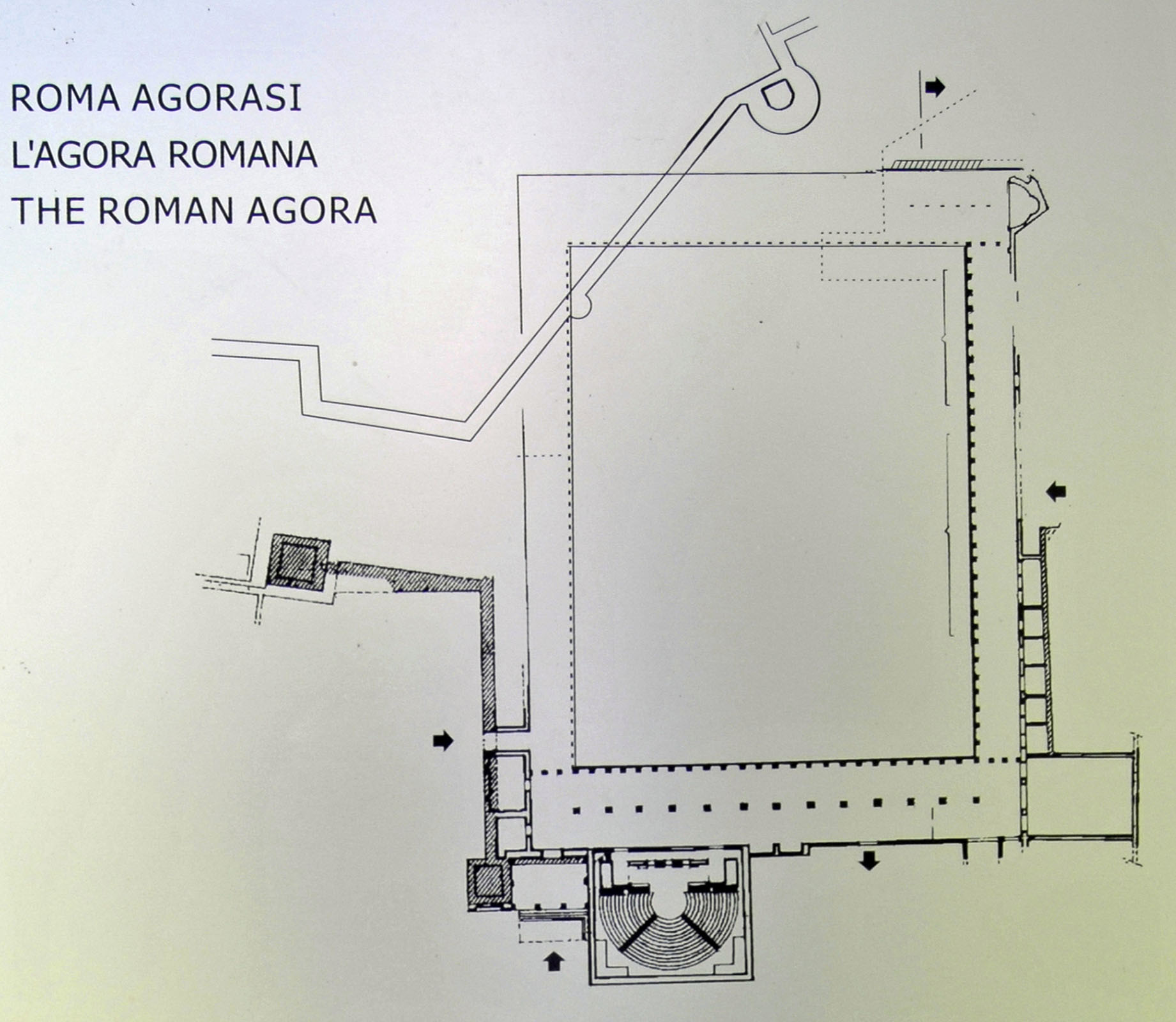
Iasos Agora Plan

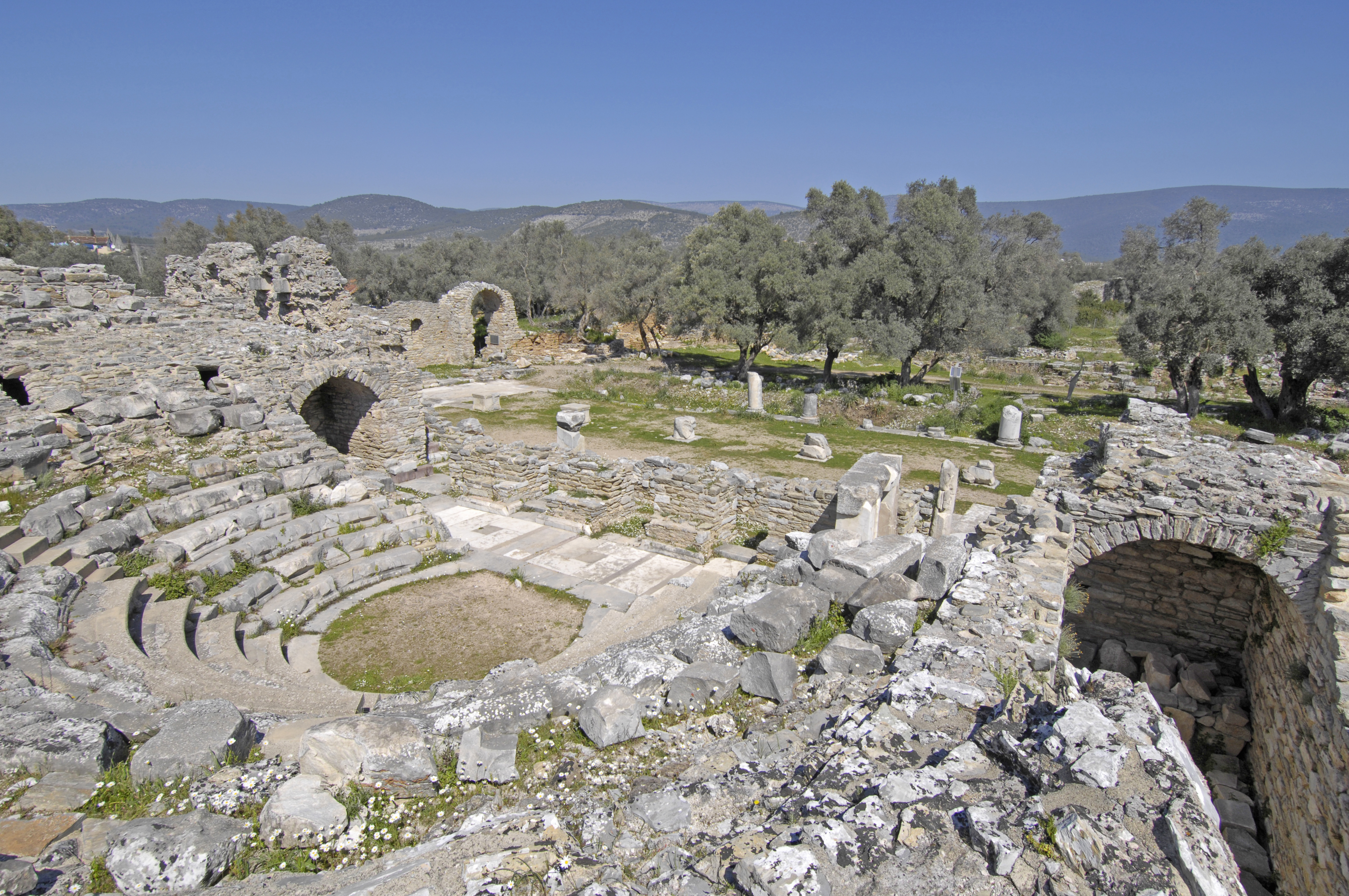
Iasos Agora Bouleuterion

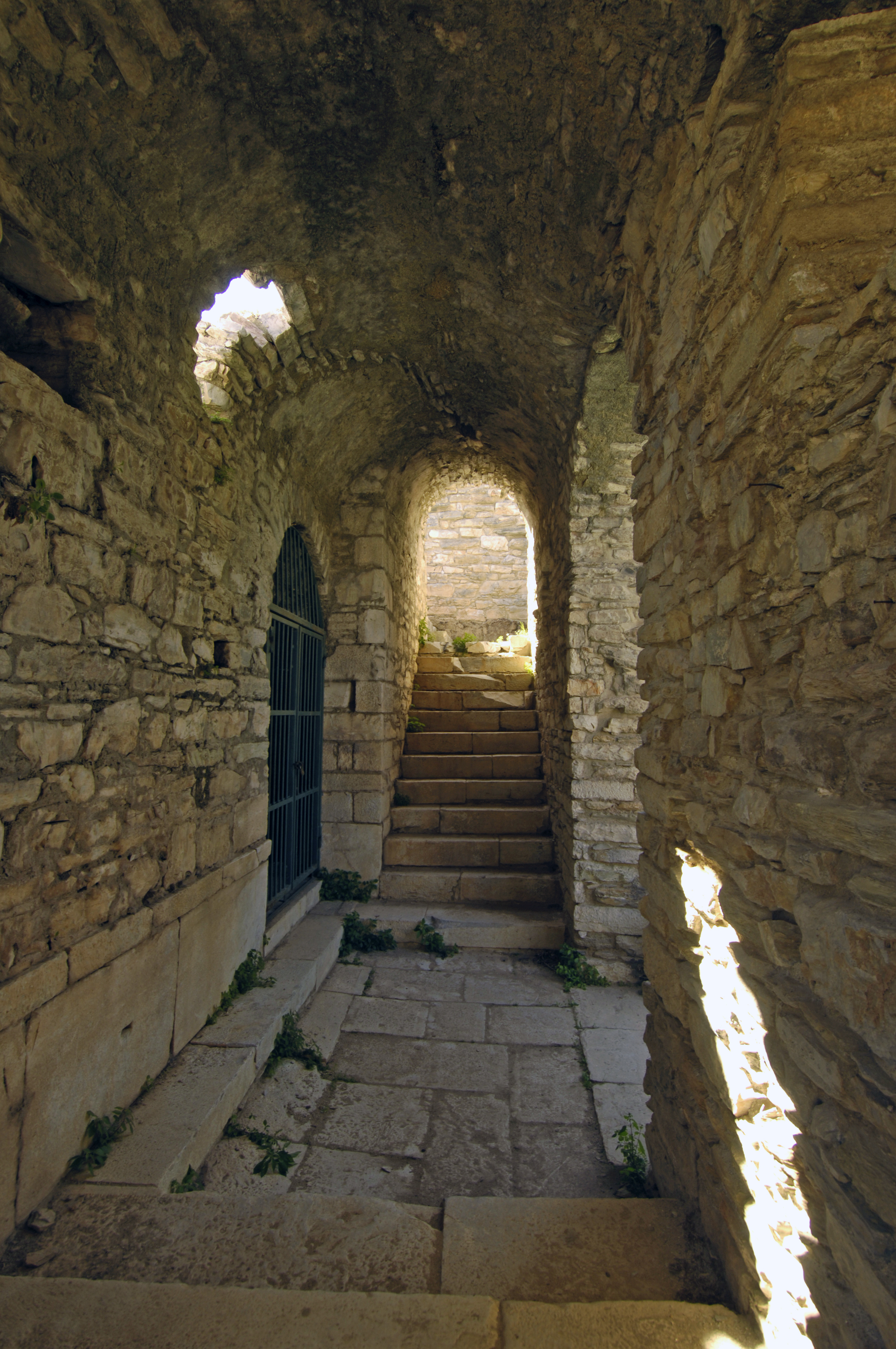
Iasos Agora Bouleuterion

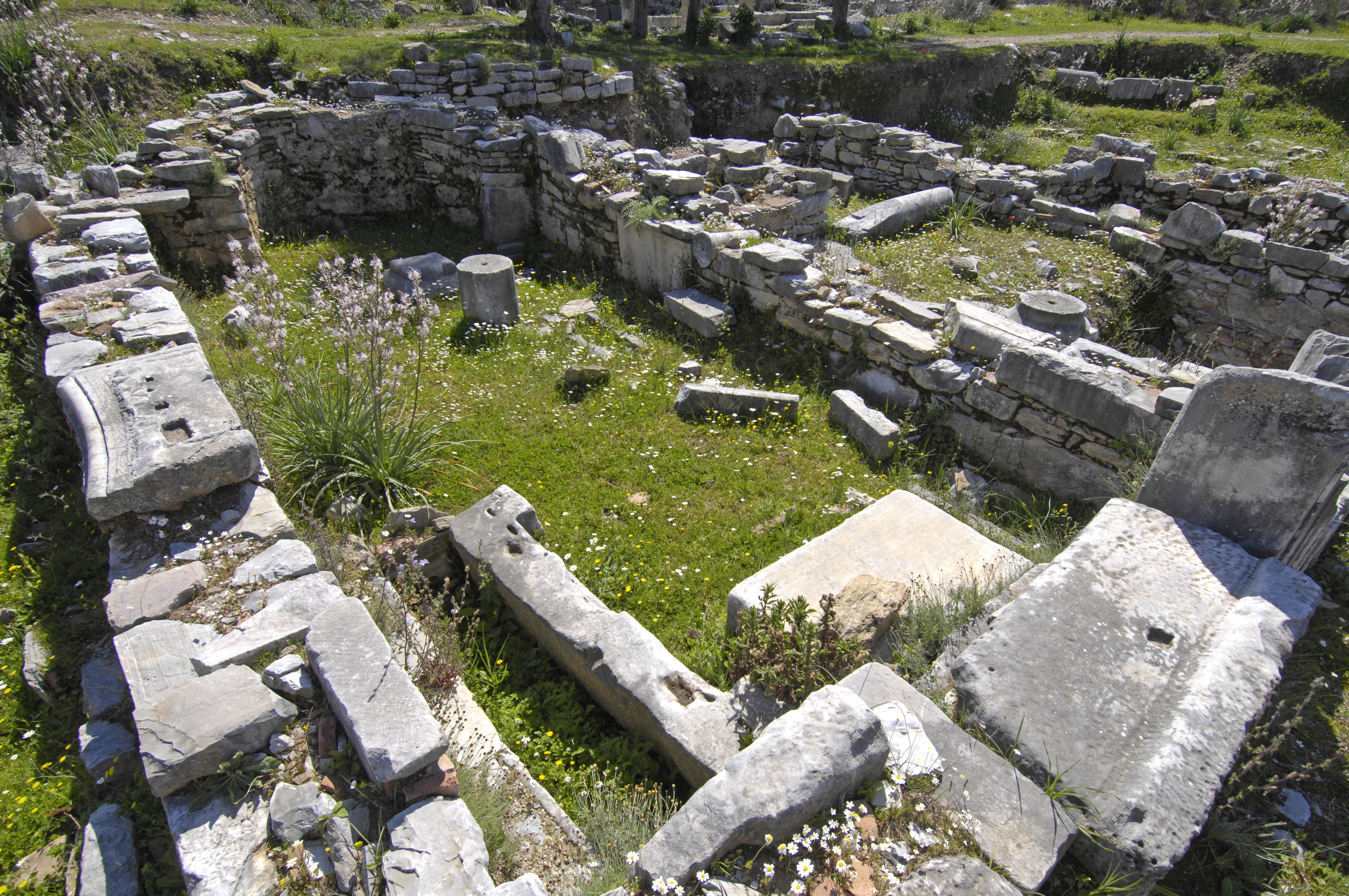
Iasos Agora Basilica

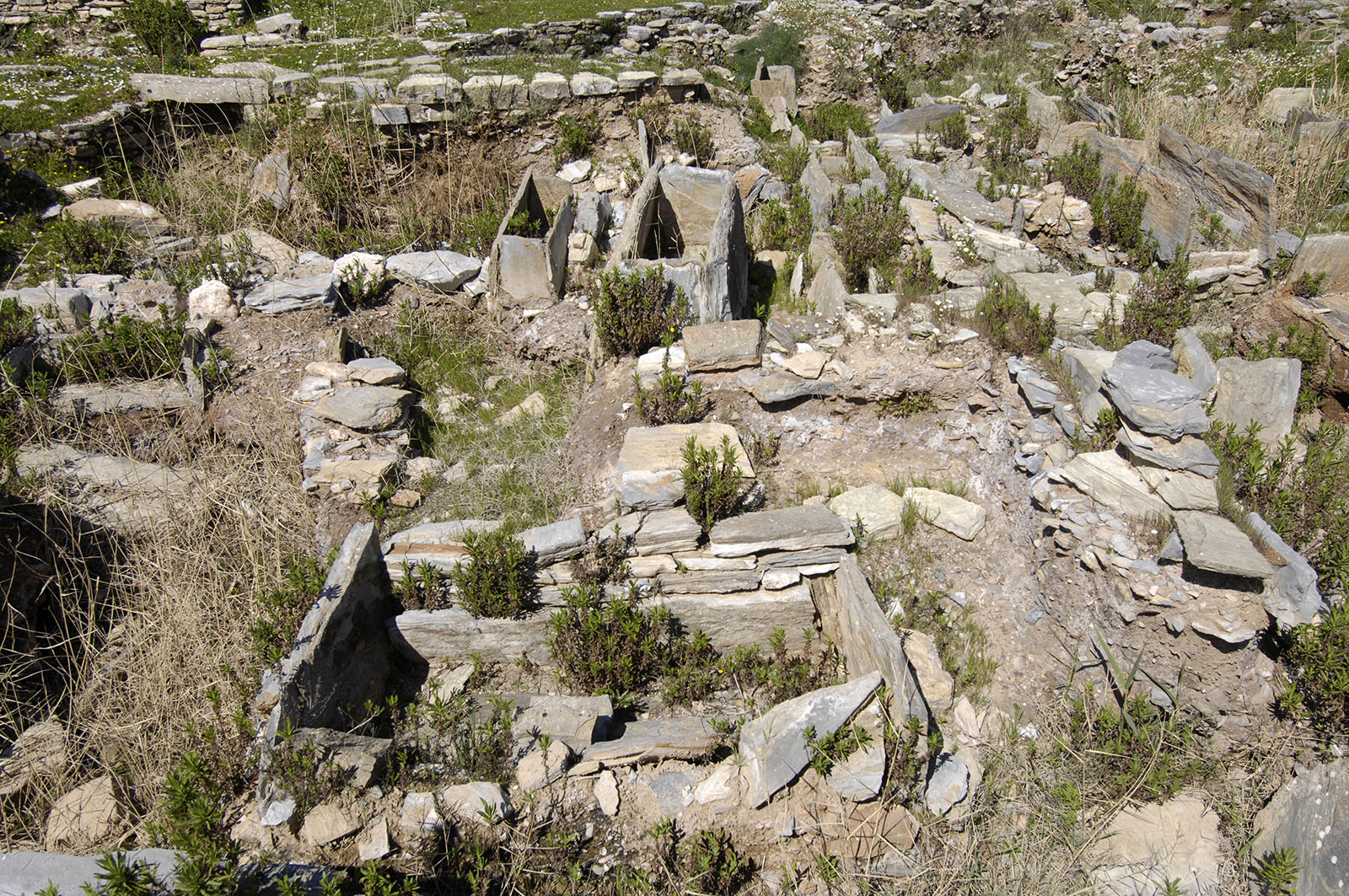
Iasos at agora Necropolis

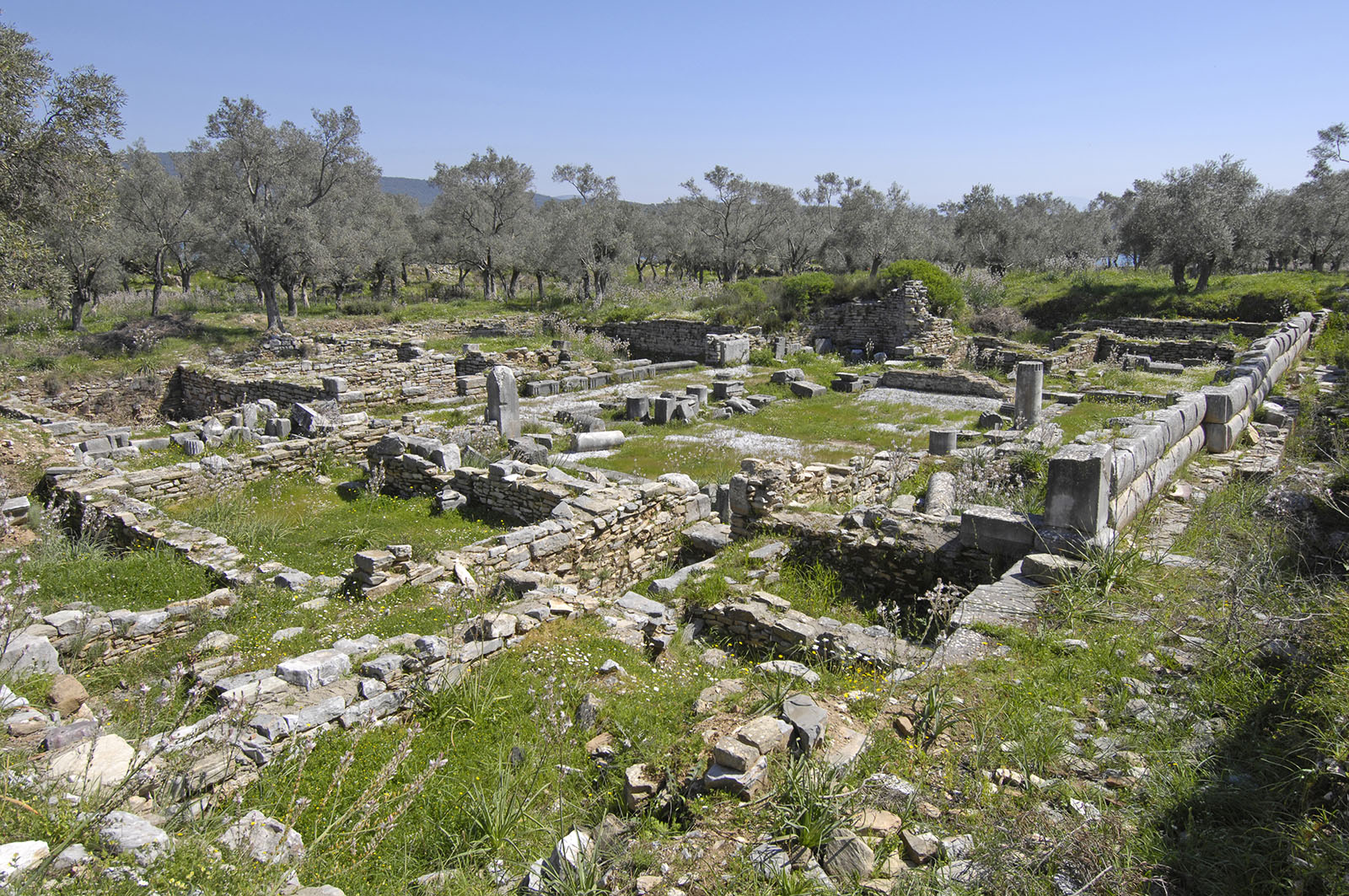
Iasos at agora Zeus Megistos area

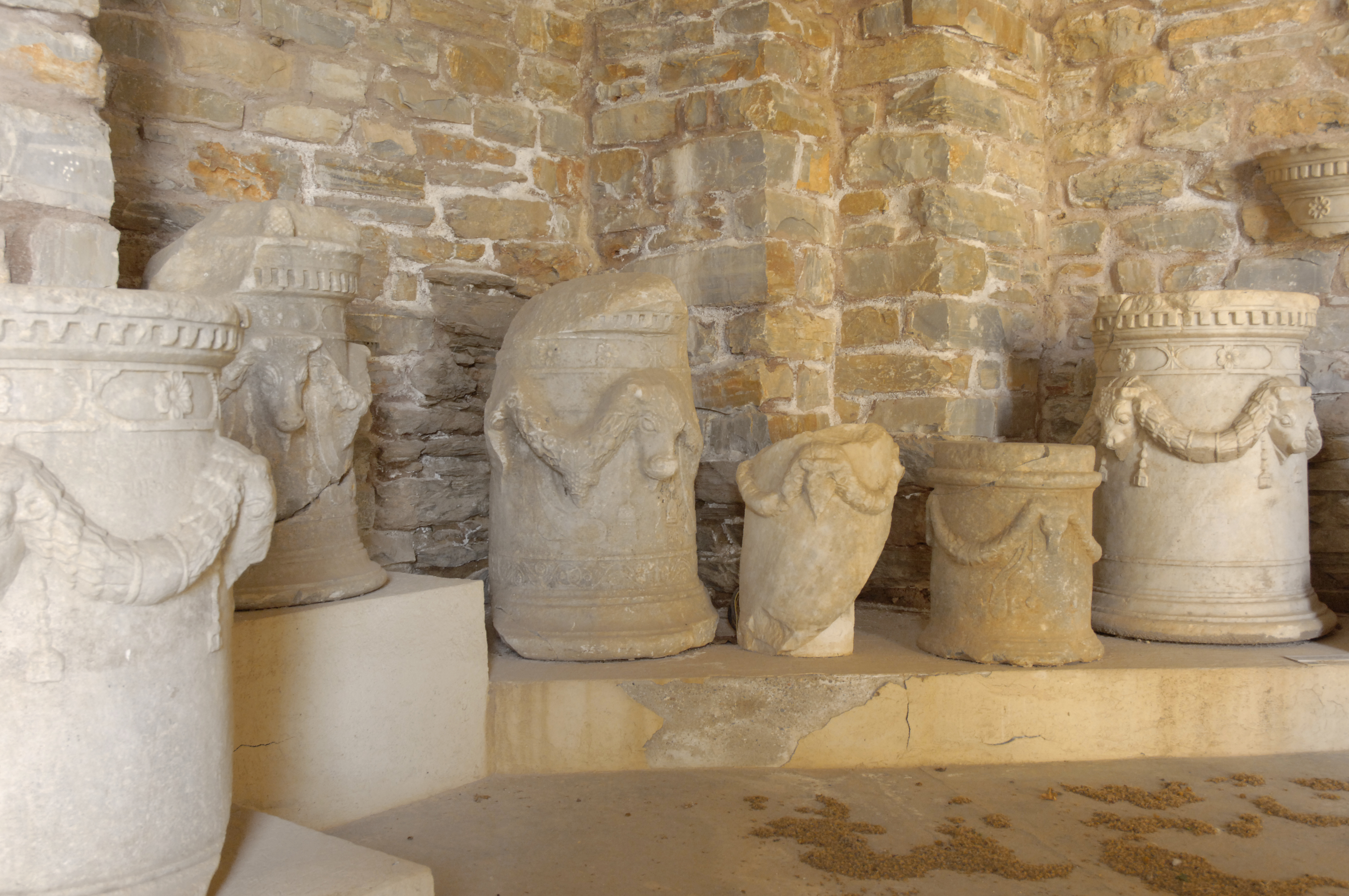
Iasos museum Altars

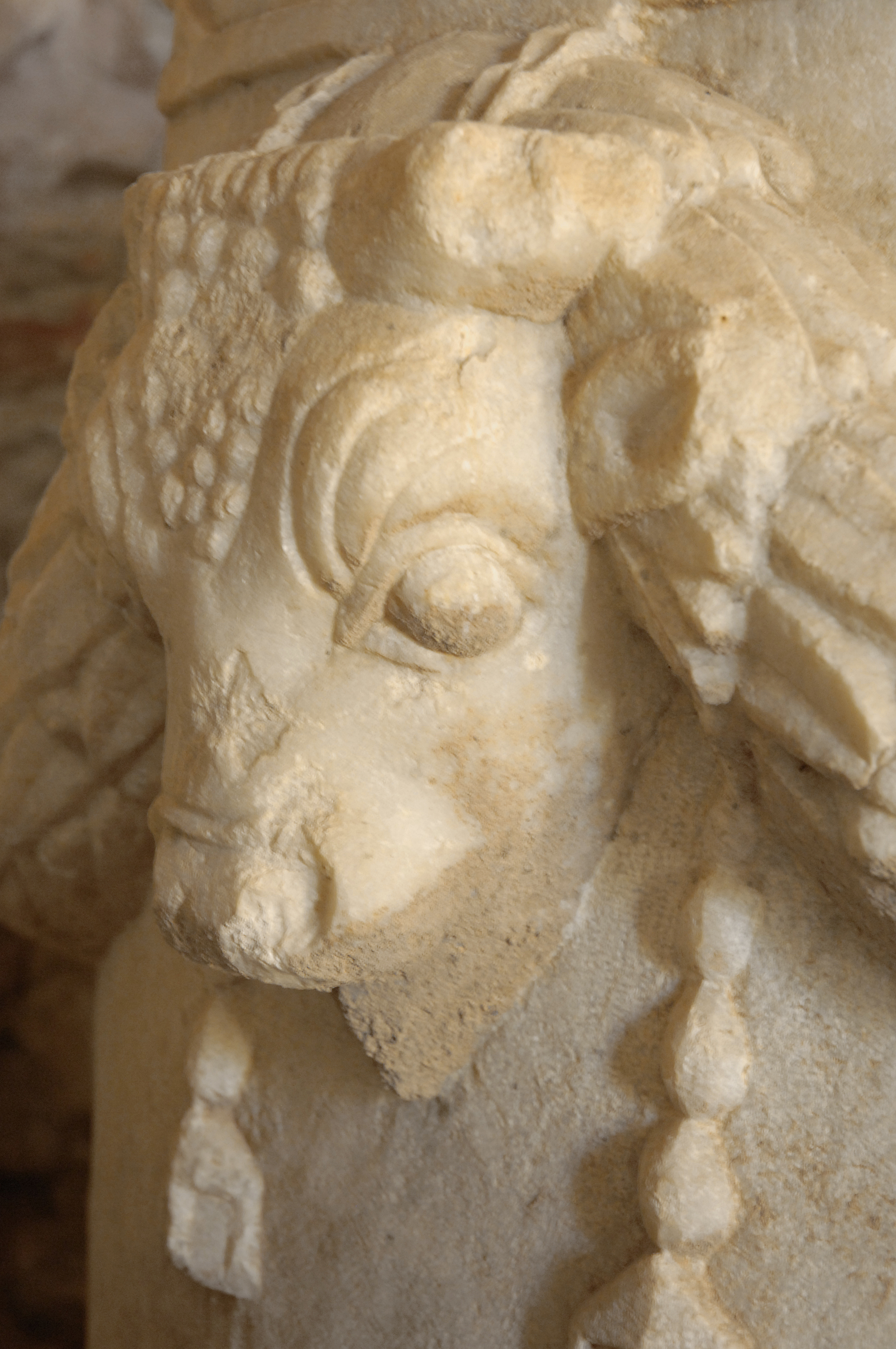
Iasos museum Altar detail

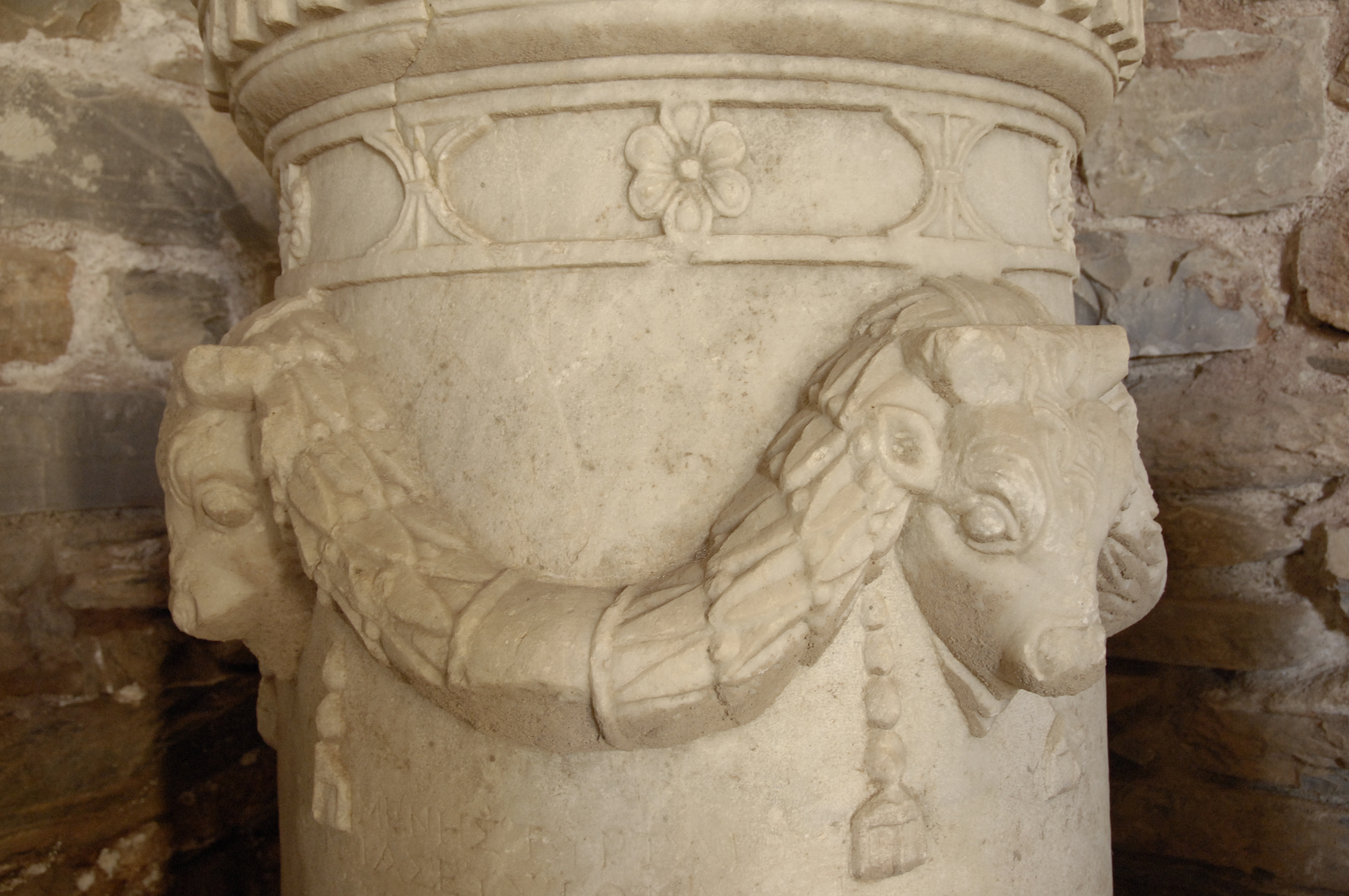
Iasos museum Altar detail

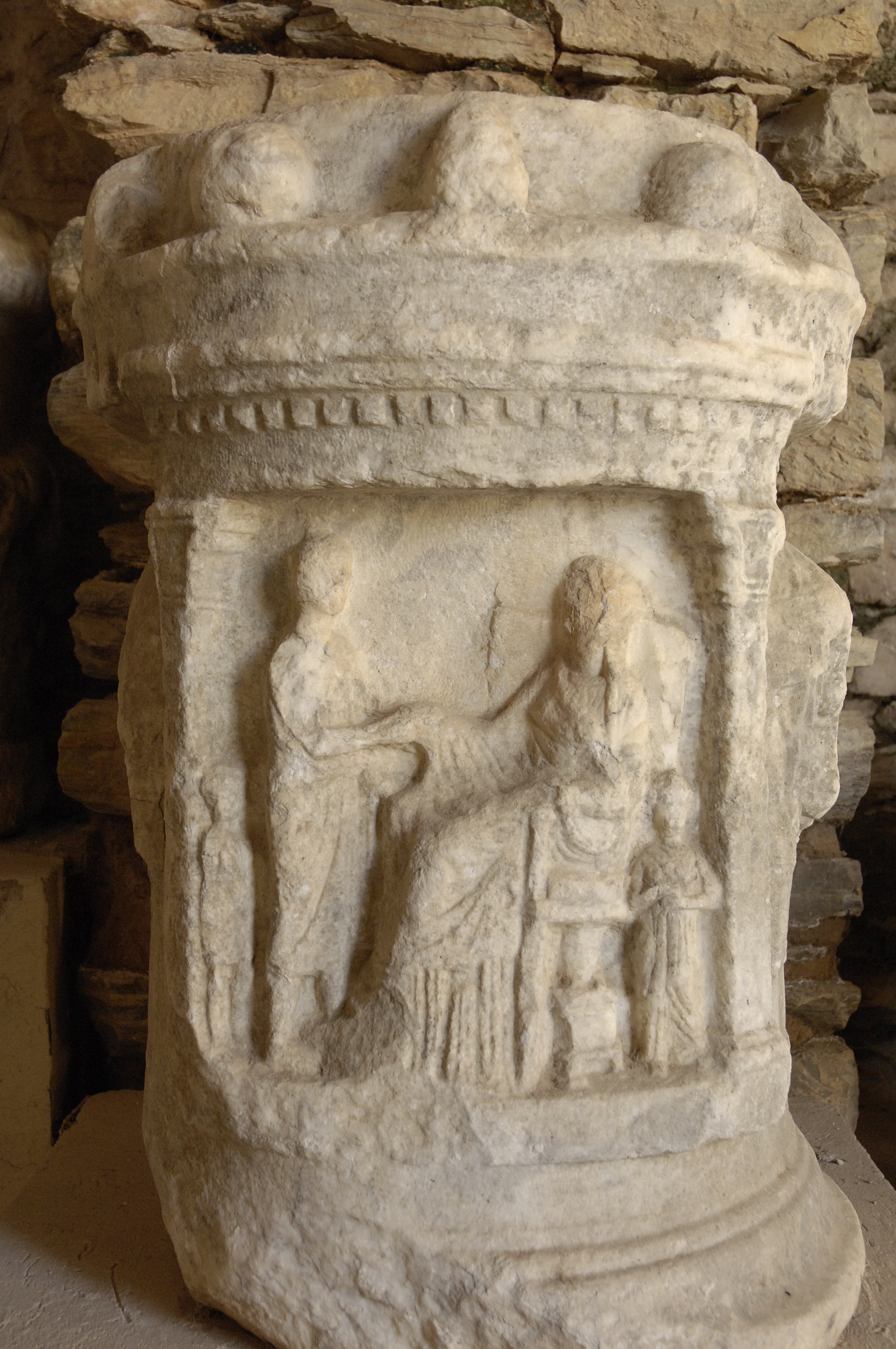
Iasos museum Altar

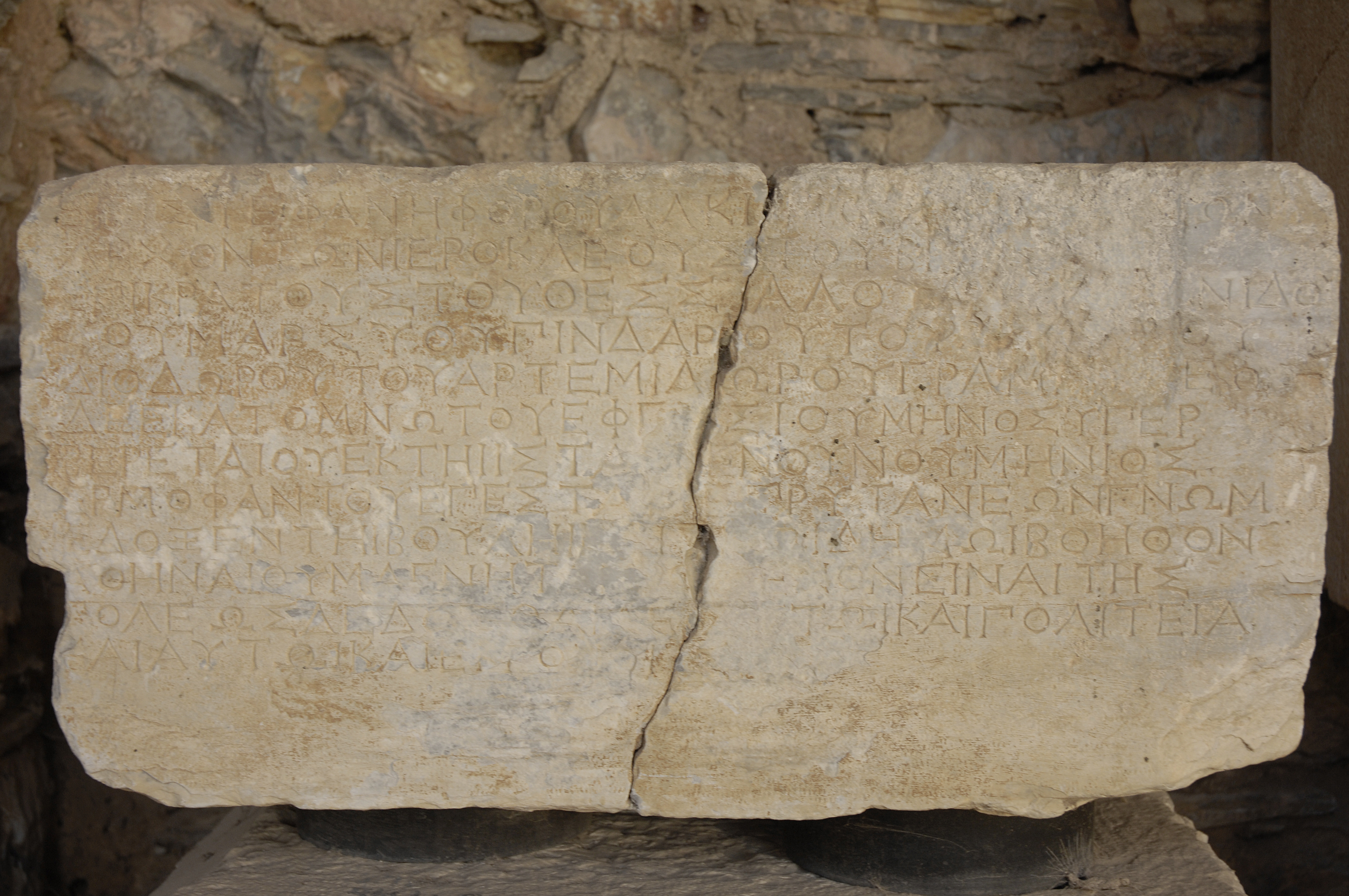
Iasos museum Treaty

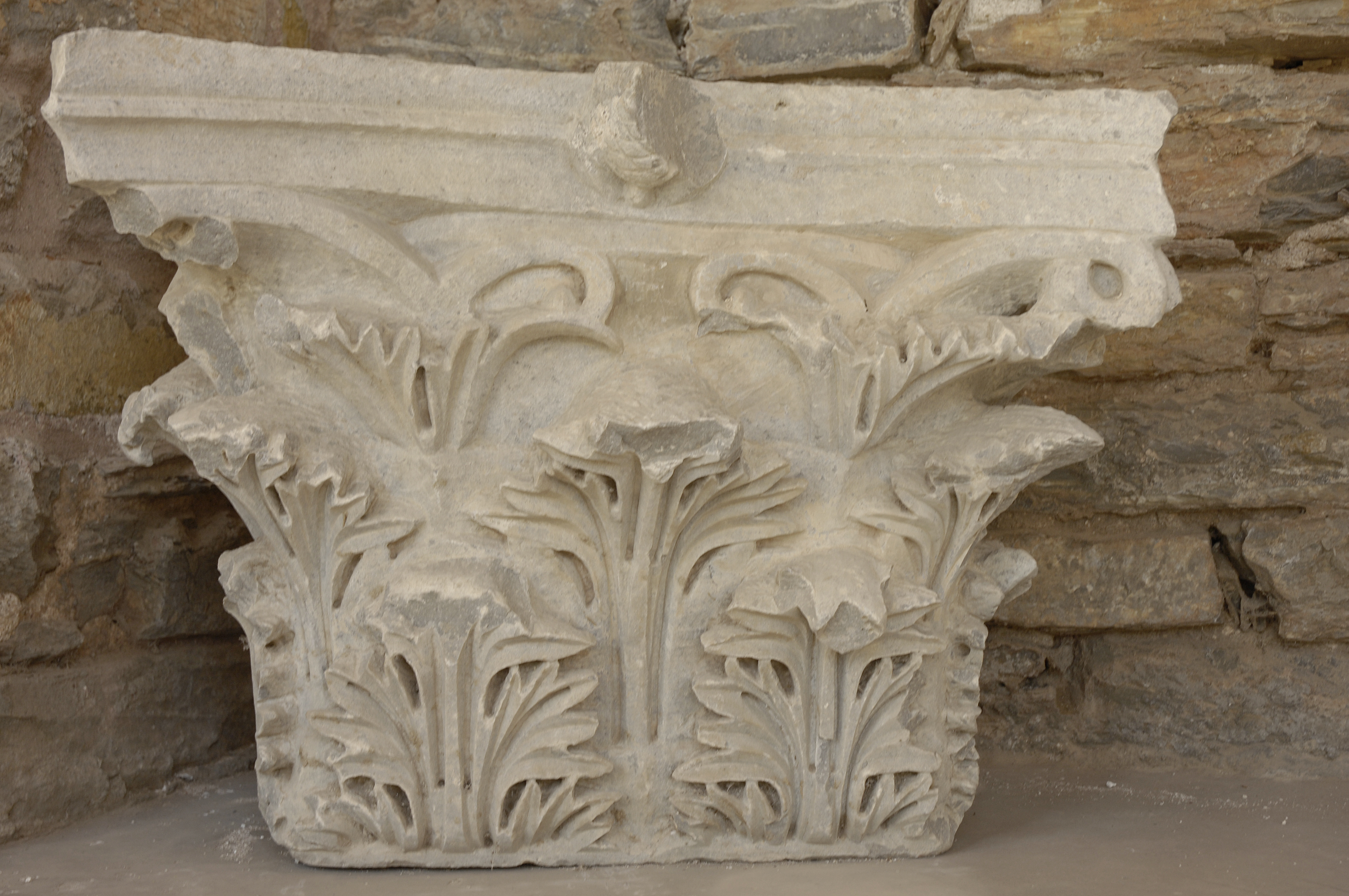
Iasos museum Capital

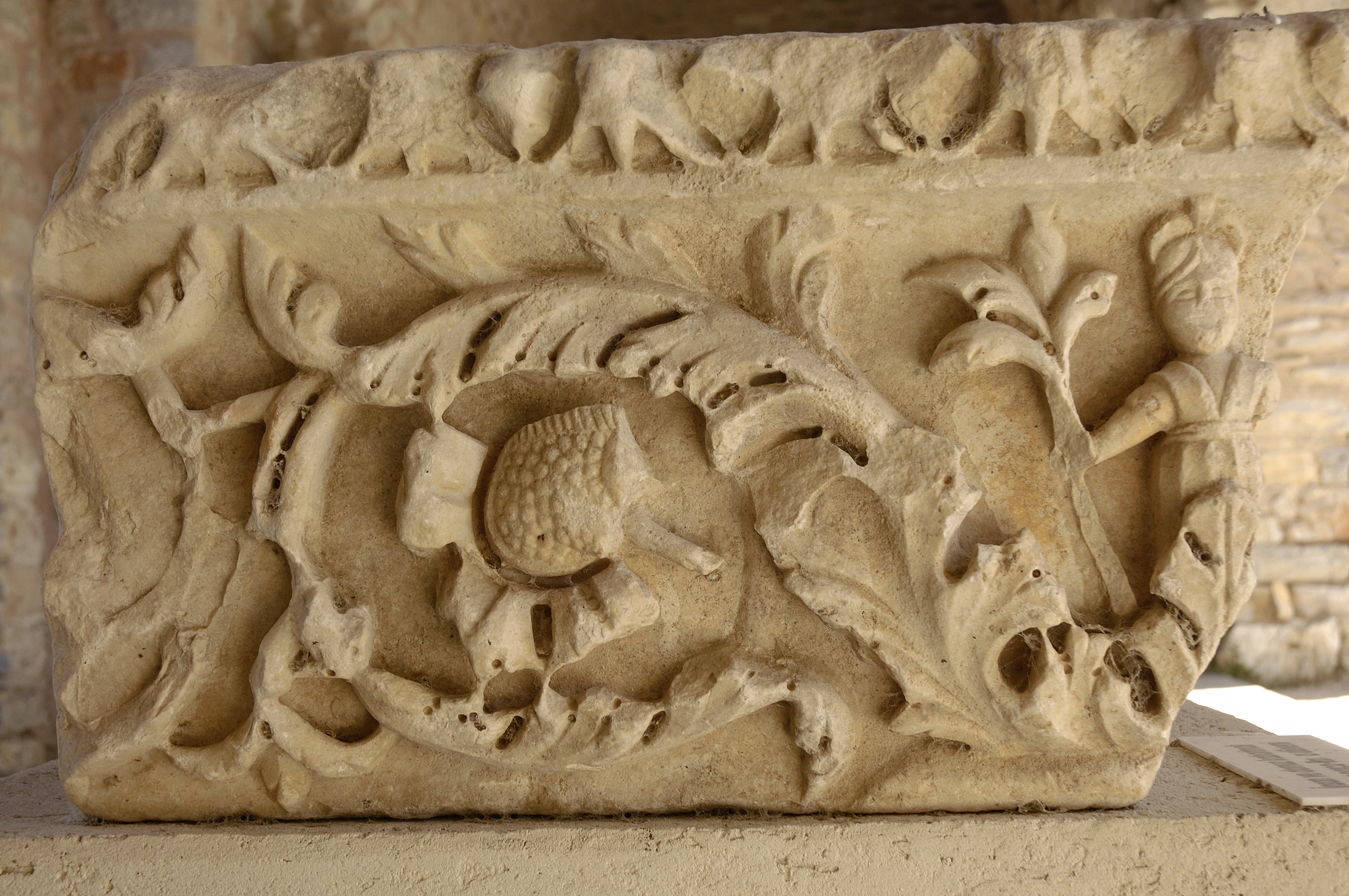
Iasos museum Frieze

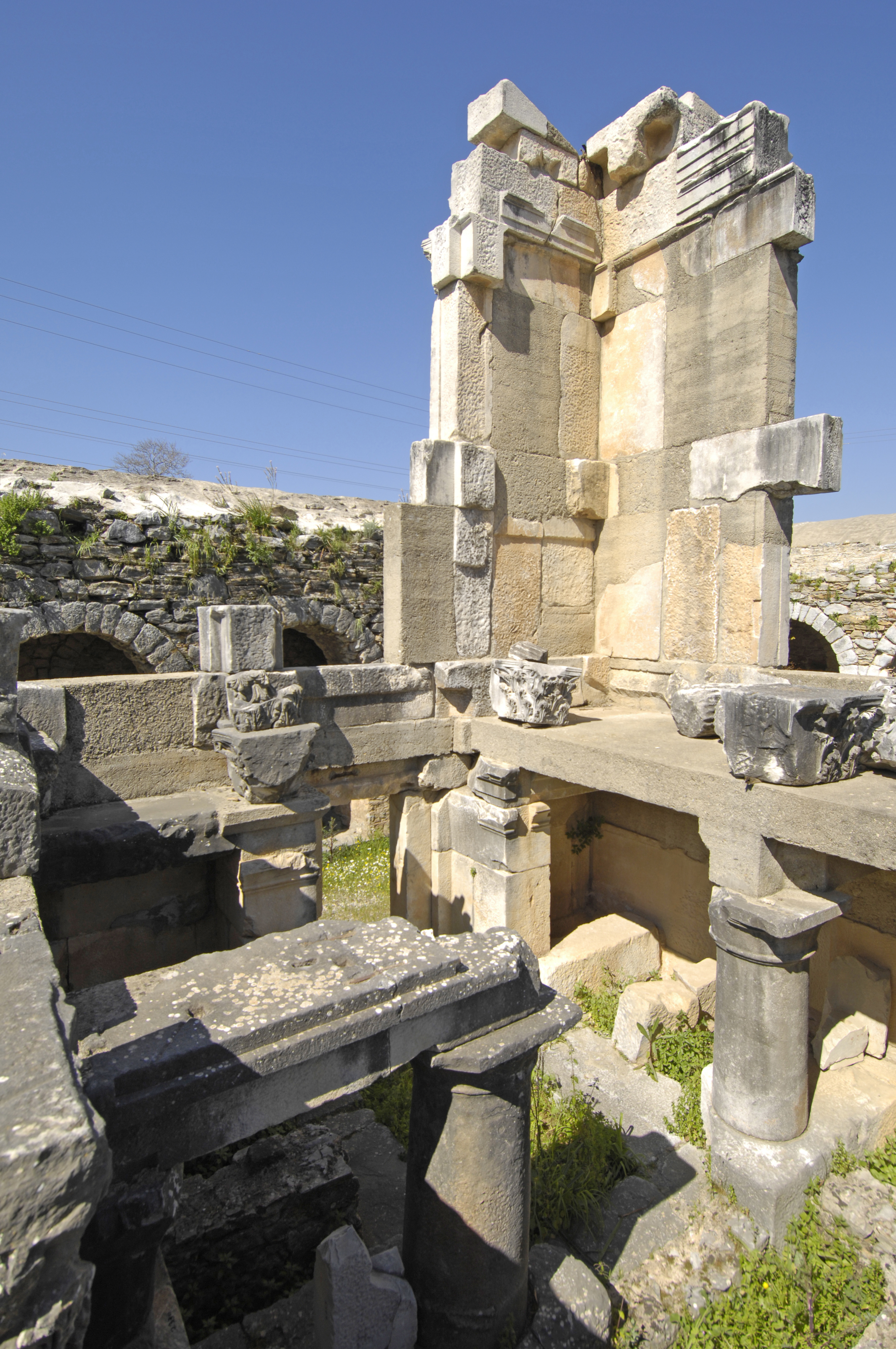
Iasos museum

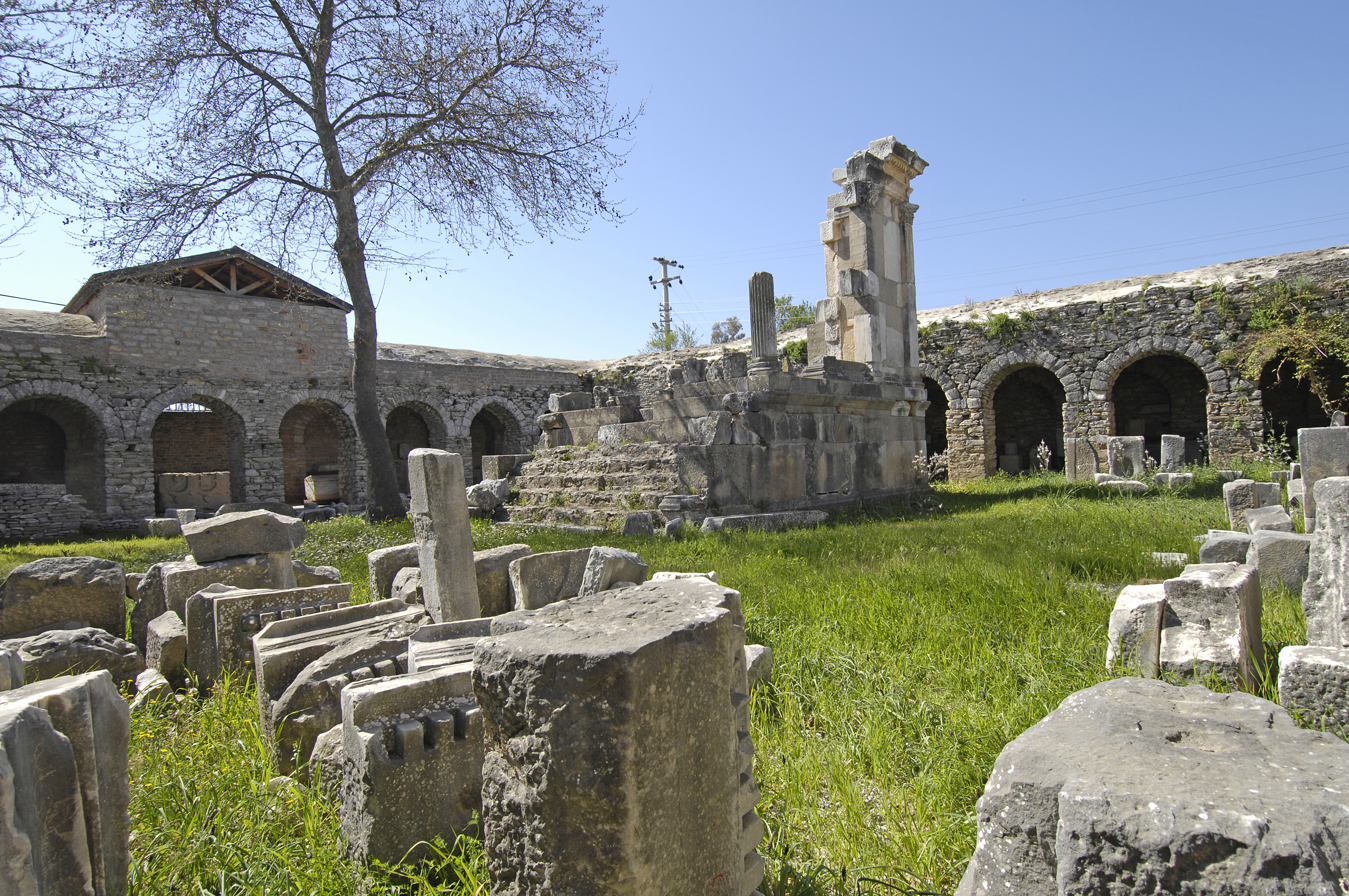
Iasos museum

== See also ==
- List of ancient Greek cities
