= Forensic Science Institute of Turkey =

- Adli Bilimler Enstitüsü
- Interactive map of Forensic Science Institute of Turkey
- Location: Istanbul, Turkey
- Coordinates: 40°54′49.27″N 29°10′36.31″E
- Area: 40 ha (99 acres)
- Created: 2012; 14 years ago

Forensic Science Institute of Turkey is located in Istanbul, Turkey. It was designed by Turkish architect Günay Erdem, and landscape architects Sunay Erdem and Serpil Öztekin Erdem.

== Quick facts ==
- Total land area: 225,000 m^{2} (2,420,000 sq ft)
- Total buildings area: 200,000 m^{2} (2,200,000 sq ft)
- Functions: theoretical training areas, practical training areas, faculties, laboratories, library, administrative units, sports center, indoor swimming pool, hotel, convention center, refectory, student clubs, training pond, technology and research center
- Project Cost: $300 million
- Population: 2000 students
