= Günay Erdem =

Turkish architect

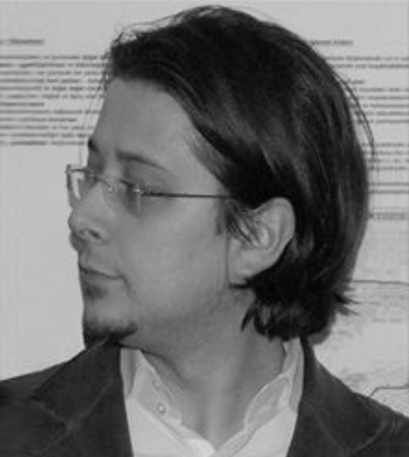
- Günay Erdem in 2014
- Born: 18 April 1978 (age 48); Shumen, Bulgaria
- Occupation: Architect

Günay Erdem (born 18 April 1978) is a Turkish Architect (graduated) and self-taught landscape architect. Günay Erdem together with his brother Sunay Erdem leads architectural and urban design practice Erdem Architects which they founded in 1998. Differently from majority of other architects and landscape architects Günay Erdem dissolves the boundaries of these two disciplines in his designs. Using this interdisciplinary approach Günay Erdem‘s both architectural and urban designs gains unique innovative characteristics. Günay Erdem designed many architectural and urban design projects in 40 countries. He won National Architecture Award in National Architecture Exhibition 2010/Category:Presentation of Ideas.

== Teaching ==
Since 2012 Günay Erdem has been teaching at Atılım University Department of Architecture Basics of Design and Architectural Design. Günay Erdem in 2013 also has taught at the TOBB ETÜ Department of Architecture where he was Architectural Design Studio executer. At 2014 he was invited to Başkent University Department of Architecture to taught at Architectural Design Studios. Günay Erdem also has been invited to many Architectural Departments at different Universities as the jury member of Design Studios.

== Awards ==
Recognition Awards

- 2010 Turkish National Architecture Awards and Exhibition/Category: Presentation of Ideas
- TSMD Success Award, Turkey, 2010

Awards in International Competitions

- La Spezia Arsenale 2062 Open Competition, Italy, Winner, 2014
- Regional Center for Educational Quality and Excellence Competition, Jubail, Saudi Arabia, 3rd Award, 2014
- 3C: Comprehensive Coastal Communities Ideas Competition, New York, USA, Wildcard Winner, 2013
- ENVISION 2040, a Green Works Orlando Design Competition, Orlando, USA, Winner, 2013
- International Festival of Art & Construction, Sunshade Competition, Spain, 1st Prize, 2013
- Actıvate! Desıgn Competition to Redefine Public Space in Chicago, USA Honorable Mention, 2013
- Art In The Plaza, Minneapolis, USA, 1st Place, 2013
- Home For Humanity Contest, San Francisco, USA, Winner, 2012
- LifeEdited Apartment #2Challenge Competition, New York, USA, Winner, 2012
- Recconect Riverton Pedestrian Bridge, Canada, Winner, 2011
- Vancouver Viaducts & eastern core, re:CONNECT An Open Ideas Competition, Vancouver, Canada, Winner, 2011
- The Old Harbour Along With Örfirisey in Reykjavik International Competition, Reykjavik, Iceland, Winner, 2009
- ‘Former Fiume Veneto Cotton Mill Area’ International Competition, 9th Position, Turkey, 2004

Awards in National Competitions

- Elazig Education Campus, National Competition, Mention, Turkey, 2013
- Smart Sings Competition, Mention Award, Turkey, 2011
- Zonguldak Lavuar Conservation Area And The Surrounding Urban Design Competition, Purchasing, Turkey, 2010
- Memorial For The Sarikamis Operation National Architectural Competition, 3rd Award, Turkey, 2008
- Adana Ziyapasa District Urban Design Competition, Purchasing, Turkey, 2008
- Maltepe Regional Park Project Competition, 3rd Award, Turkey, 2007
- Diyarbakir Valley Landscape Planning And Urban Design Competition, 2nd Award, Turkey, 2007
- Teos Marina, 1st Project, Turkey, 2006
- Çeşme Marina, 1st Project, Turkey, 2006
- Kahramanmaras Town Hall Competition, 1st Purchasing, Turkey, 2006
- Balikesir Çamlik Park National Architectural Competition, Purchasing, Turkey, 2006
- Bursa Terminal Square National Architectural Competition, Purchasing, Turkey, 2006
- Beylikduzu Cumhuriyet Street Design Architectural Competition, Mention, Turkey, 2006
- Bursa Kaplikaya Valley Landscape Design Competition, Purchasing, Turkey, 2006
- Uzundere Rekreation Valley Landscape Design Competition, 5th Mention, Turkey, 2006
- Izmit Historical Centre Urban Renewal Design Competition, 1st Mention, Turkey, 2005
- Van Besyol Time Square Design Competition, 3rd Award, Turkey, 2005
- Trabzon Kalkinma Downtown Landscape Design Project, Purchasing, Turkey, 2005
- Gaziosmanpasa City Hall And Environmental Design Competition, 2nd Award, Turkey, 2004
- Izmit Basiskele Environmental Design Competition, 1st Award, Turkey, 2003
- Pananos Beach Landscape Design Competition, Purchasing, Turkey, 2003
- Ottoman Empire Memorial Park Competition, Purchasing, Turkey, 2002
- Damlatas Cave Restoration And Atatürk Park Competition, 1st Award, Turkey, 1999

== Selected projects ==
- American University of the Middle East (Kuwait, 2012)
- Köprülü Kanyon National Park School (Antalya, Turkey, 2015)
- Esertepe Parkı (Ankara, Turkey, 2014)
- Information and Communication Technologies Authority (Ankara, Turkey, 2012)
- Karabük University Stadium (Karabük, Turkey, 2011)
- Bingöl University Campus (Bingöl, Turkey, 2011)
- Silicon Valley of Turkey (Gebze, Turkey, 2014)
- Forensic Science Institute of Turkey (Istanbul, Turkey, 2012)
- Karabük University Square (Karabük, Turkey, 2010)
- Elazığ Culture Park (Elazığ, Turkey, 2008)
- Teos Marina (Seferihisar, İzmir, Turkey, 2008)
- Elaziğ Education Campus, (Elazığ, Turkey, 2013)
- Malatya Planetarium (Malatya, Turkey, 2015)
- Beydağ City (Malatya, Turkey, 2015)
- Horata City (Malatya, Turkey, 2012)
- Port Malabo (Malabo, Equatorial Guinea, 2003)
- Güllük Port (Güllük, Bodrum, Turkey, 2003)
- International Police Training Center (Ankara, Turkey, 2011)
- Edirne Terminal (Edirne, Turkey, 2010)
- Datça Körmen Marina (Datça, Turkey, 2010)
- HB:BX, High Bridge (New York City, United States, 2010)
- Paris Courthouse (Paris, France, 2006)
- Hobart Waterfront (Hobart, Tasmania, 2007)
- Ankara Sincan Metro Station (Sincan, Ankara, Turkey 2009)
- Kumkuyu Marina (Kumkuyu, Turkey, 2009)
- Ministry of Foreign Affairs (Ankara, Turkey, 2009)
- Bursa Nature Park (Bursa, Turkey, 2009)
- Kahramanmaraş Municipality (Kahramanmaraş, Turkey, 2006)
- Çeşme Marina (Çeşme, Turkey, 2006)
- Kaş Marina (Kaş, Antalya, Turkey, 2006)
- Ören Marina (Ören, Fethiye, Turkey, 2009)
- Denizli Government House (Denizli, Turkey, 2005)
- Bursa Santral Garaj Square (Bursa, Turkey, 2005)
- Yeşilyurt Stadium (Konak, İzmir, Turkey, 2003)

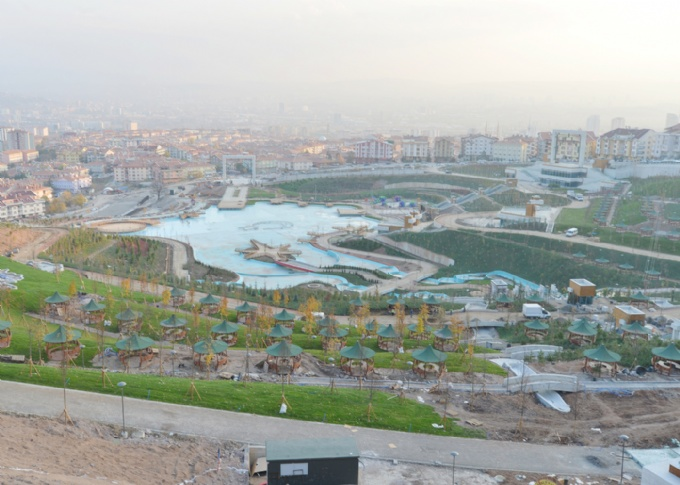
Esertepe Parkı, Ankara, Turkey

== Exhibitions ==
- 2013 – AIA Bookstore, Washington Square, Philadelphia
