= Güllük Gulf =

Coordinates: 37°11′02″N 27°29′49″E

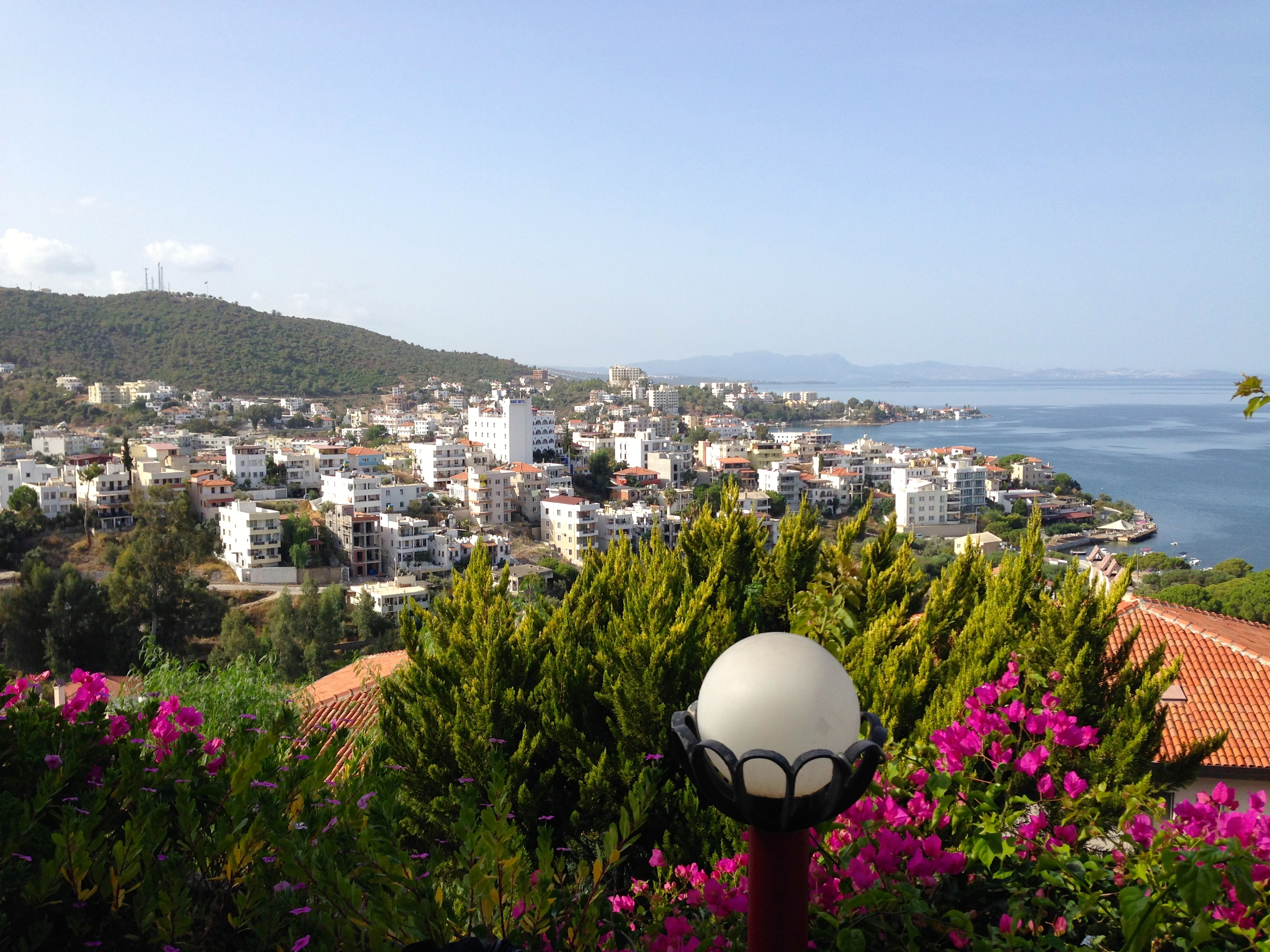
Güllük town at Güllük Gulf (right) seen from the north east

Güllük Gulf (Turkish: Güllük Körfezi), also called Mandalya Gulf, is an Aegean gulf of Turkey.

The gulf is situated to the north of Bodrum Peninsula and to the south of Dilek Peninsula. Administratively, its coast is a part of Bodrum and Milas ilçes (districts) of Muğla Province, except for a small region, which is a part of Didim ilçe of Aydın Province. The width of the gulf from north to south is over 13.5 miles (21.7 km), and the distance between the entrance and the maximum inlet, from west to east, is also over 20 miles (32 km).

The gulf is famous for tourist resorts such as Güllük, Torba, Güvercinlik and Türkbükü. The archaeological site of Iasos is also at the east coast of the gulf. Some coves on the eastern part of the bay are occupied by fish farms which threaten to spoil the environment.
