= Silicon Valley of Turkey =

IT Valley
- Bilişim Vadisi
- Interactive map of IT Valley
- Location: Gebze, Turkey
- Coordinates: 40°47′10.90″N 29°30′20.00″E
- Area: 180 ha (440 acres)
- Created: 2014; 12 years ago
- Website: bilisimvadisi.com.tr

IT Valley (Turkish: Bilişim Vadisi), formerly known as Silicon Valley of Turkey (Turkish: Türkiye'nin Silikon Vadisi) was a proposed project of Turkish architect Günay Erdem and Turkish landscape architect Sunay Erdem for the Turkish version of the Silicon Valley at San Francisco, United States.

== Concept and design ==
Erdem used cosmos and technology concepts together with traditional Turkish values at design development process. Cosmos reflects as symbolic radial grid of the Solar System and planetary forms to the buildings. Technology reflects as digital grid in organization schema of design. Traditional Turkish value star and crescent emerges in the whole Silicon Valley City.

== Quick facts ==
- Total Plot Area: 1,800,000 m^{2}
- Total Buildings Area: 900,000 m^{2}
- Buildings: Administrative, Research & Development Centers (small, medium and large scaled), City Center (Mall, Restaurants, Cinemas etc.), Congress & Convention Center, Hotel, Housing, Sports Center, Schools (Elementary & High), Health Center, Mosque
- Marina
- Valley
- Park
- Circulations: Traffic, Cycle Lane, Light Rail Road
- Accesses: Ankara Istanbul Highway, Marmara Sea, North, South
- Project Cost: $400 million
