= Choerilus of Iasus =

4th century BC Greek poet

Choerilus of Iasus (Ancient Greek: Χοιρίλος) was an epic poet of Iasus in Caria, who lived in the 4th century BC. He accompanied Alexander the Great on his campaigns as court-poet. He is well known from the passages in Horace according to which he received a piece of gold for every good verse he wrote in celebration of the glorious deeds of his master. The view of his verses by Horace may be estimated from the remark misattributed to Alexander in his Ars Poetica, that he would rather be the Thersites of Homer than the Achilles of Choerilus. In reality, however, this remark by Alexander was towards Anaximenes. The epitaph on Sardanapalus, said to have been translated from the Chaldean, is generally supposed to be by Choerilus.

== Sources ==
- In this article, he is the third poet named Choerilus discussed. This article cites
  - G. Kinkel (1877). Epicorum Graecorum Fragmenta. Lipsiae, in aedibus B.G. Teubneri. p. i.
  - August Ferdinand Näke (1817). De Choerili Samii Aetate Vita et Poesi aliisque Choerilis. where the above poet is carefully distinguished from the others of the same name
  - Pauly-Wissowa (1899). Realencyclopädie der Classischen Altertumswissenschaft. Vol. iii. p. 2.
  - Walsh, J. (2011) “The Lamiaka of Choerilus of Iasos and the Genesis of the term ‘Lamian War,’” CQ 61.2: 538–44.
  - Pelucchi, M. (2022). Cherilo di Iaso. Testimonianze, frammenti, fortuna. De Gruyter: Berlin; Boston.
