= Karabük University =

Public university in Karabük, Turkey

- Motto: Çağdaş Eğitim Yuvanız
- Motto in English: Your Home for Contemporary Education
- Type: Public
- Established: 2007
- Affiliations: Council of Higher Education; Bologna Process
- Rector: Prof. Dr. Fatih Kırışık
- Students: 52,000
- Location: Karabük, Turkey
- Campus: Suburban
- Website: karabuk.edu.tr

University rankings

Regional – Overall
- QS Emerging Europe and Central Asia: 301-350 (2022)

Karabük University (Turkish: Karabük Üniversitesi) is a public university in Karabük, Turkey. It was founded in 2007 as one of the 17 new universities of that time in Turkey. Karabük University, ranked among the 801- 1000 in the list of the best universities in the world published by Times Higher Education (THE) for 2020 and 801-1000 in the 2021 World rankings.

== Academic structure ==
The academic structure of KBÜ contains fourteen faculties, four graduate schools, four schools and seven vocational schools.

=== Faculties ===
- Faculty of Literature
- Faculty of Science
- Faculty of Fethi Toker Fine Arts and Design
- Faculty of Architecture
- Faculty of Economic and Administrative Sciences
- Faculty of Theology
- Faculty of Management
- Faculty of Engineering
- Faculty of Technical Education
- Faculty of Technology
- Faculty of Medicine

=== Institutes ===
- Graduate School of Iron and Steel
- Graduate School of Natural and Applied Sciences
- Graduate School of Social Sciences
- Graduate School of Health Sciences

=== Schools ===
- School of Health
- School of Hasan Doğan Physical Education and Sports
- School of Foreign Languages

=== Vocational Schools ===
- Karabük Vocational School
- Eskipazar Vocational School (in Eskipazar)
- Safranbolu Vocational School (in Safranbolu)
- Yenice Vocational School (in Yenice)
- The Union of Chambers and Commodity Exchanges of Turkey Vocational School of Technical Sciences

== Facilities ==
=== Main campus ===
The main campus is in the Balıklarkayası suburb of Karabük. Most of the university's centers and faculties are on campus.

=== Karabük University Stadium ===
Karabük University Stadium is at the end and at the highest point of the campus. Beside its main function as a football pitch, the stadium serves as a Physical Education and Sports School. Its unique crescent and star exterior form distinguishes it from other stadiums. It serves as the main gathering place for large-scale events such as football games, graduation ceremonies, concerts, festivals, fairs etc.

=== Karabük University Square ===
Karabük University Square welcomes students and other visitors right after the entrance bridge of the campus. The square is between the Rector’s Building and the Faculty Buildings. It serves as a gathering place for small celebrations, concerts, etc. Its unique design enriches the campus atmosphere and promotes Karabük University from others.

== Affiliations ==
The university is a member of the Caucasus University Association.

== Partner universities ==
- Sakarya University, Turkey
