= International Police Training Center =

Police academy in Turkey

- Uluslararası Polis Eğitim Merkezi
- Interactive map of International Police Training Center
- Location: Ankara, [urkey
- Coordinates: 40°04′19″N 32°53′39″E
- Area: 100 ha (250 acres)
- Created: 2011; 15 years ago

International Police Training Center located in Ankara, Turkey is the third biggest police training center on earth after the FBI Academy in the United States and the Police Staff College, Bramshill in the United Kingdom. The whole campus was designed by the Turkish architect Günay Erdem and world known landscape architect Sunay Erdem, with the support of landscape architect Serpil Öztekin Erdem.

== Quick facts ==
- Total land area: 1,000,000 m^{2} (11,000,000 sq ft)
- Total buildings area: 500,000 m^{2} (5,400,000 sq ft)
- Functions: theoretical training areas, practical training city, indoor shooting range, sports center, indoor swimming pool, stadium, advanced driving training area, library, administrative units, convention center, IPTC arena, refectory, student clubs, dormitories, training pond, technology and research center
- Project Cost: $1000 million
- Population: 3000 students
