= Erdem Architects =

Turkish international architectural firm

Erdem Architects (Erdem Mimarlar)

Practice information
- Key architects: Günay Erdem, Sunay Erdem
- Partners: Ömer Kaya
- Founded: 1998
- Location: Ankara, Istanbul, New York City, Turkey, United States

Significant works and honors
- Awards: La Spezia Arsenale 2062 Open Competition, Winner

Website
- www.erdemarchitects.com

Erdem Architects (Turkish: Erdem Mimarlar) is an international architectural firm founded in 1998 by Sunay Erdem and Günay Erdem brothers in Ankara, Turkey. Erdem Architects renders services of projects and counseling in architecture, urban planning, and landscape design.

== History ==
Sunay Erdem and Günay Erdem started working together in the late 1990s. Their first major project was the proposal for Aristotelous Redesign of the Civic Axis of Thessaloniki Competition (1997). This project proposed a linear landscape structure, cutting through Thessaloniki like a knife. Since the 1990s Erdem Architects has presented designed projects to more than forty countries, and fifty of them received awards.

== Organization ==
=== Leadership ===
Erdem Architects leadership is organized as a collaborative partnership. Erdem Architects current key partners are Günay Erdem and Sunay Erdem. Today, the architecture firm employs around 50 architects working on projects in more than 5 countries.

=== Offices ===
Erdem Architects maintains offices in Ankara, Istanbul and New York City.

== Awards ==
Recognition Awards

- Turkish National Landscape Architecture Awards (2009, 2010 and 2013) which were given by Chamber of Landscape Architects in Turkey
- 2010 Turkish National Architecture Awards and Exhibition/Category: Presentation of Ideas
- Çanakkale 18 Mart University, Success Award, Turkey, 2011
- Landscape Architecture 4 Congress, Profession Contribution Award, Turkey, 2010
- Landscape Architecture 4 Congress, International Success Award, Turkey, 2010
- TSMD Success Award, Turkey, 2010
- Chamber Of Landscape Architects, Success Awards, Turkey, 2008

Awards in International Competitions

- La Spezia Arsenale 2062 Open Competition, Italy, Winner, 2014
- Regional Center for Educational Quality and Excellence Competition, Jubail, Saudi Arabia, 3rd Award, 2014
- 3C: Comprehensive Coastal Communities Ideas Competition, New York, USA, Wildcard Winner, 2013
- ENVISION 2040, a Green Works Orlando Design Competition, Orlando, USA, Winner, 2013
- ifac2013 International Festival of Art & Construction, Sunshade Competition, Spain, 1st Prize, 2013
- Actıvate! Desıgn Competition to Redefine Public Space in Chicago, USA Honorable Mention, 2013
- Sketch Showdown Competition, Mixed Media, Philadelphia, USA, Winner, 2013
- Art In The Plaza, Minneapolis, USA, 1st Place, 2013
- Home For Humanity Contest, San Francisco, USA, Winner, 2012
- LifeEdited Apartment #2Challenge Competition, New York, USA, Winner, 2012
- Recconect Riverton Pedestrian Bridge, Canada, Winner, 2011
- Vancouver Viaducts & eastern core, re:CONNECT An Open Ideas Competition, Vancouver, Canada, Winner, 2011
- The Old Harbour Along With Örfirisey in Reykjavik International Competition, Reykjavik, Iceland, Winner, 2009

Awards in National Competitions

- Elazig Education Campus, National Competition, Mention, Turkey, 2013
- Smart Sings Competition, Mention Award, Turkey, 2011
- Zonguldak Lavuar Conservation Area And The Surrounding Urban Design Competition, Purchasing, Turkey, 2010
- Memorial For The Sarikamis Operation National Architectural Competition, 3rd Award, Turkey, 2008
- Adana Ziyapasa District Urban Design Competition, Purchasing, Turkey, 2008
- Maltepe Regional Park Project Competition, 3rd Award, Turkey, 2007
- Diyarbakir Valley Landscape Planning And Urban Design Competition, 2nd Award, Turkey, 2007
- Teos Marina, 1st Project, Turkey, 2006
- Çeşme Marina, 1st Project, Turkey, 2006
- Kahramanmaras Town Hall Competition, 1st Purchasing, Turkey, 2006
- Balikesir Çamlik Park National Architectural Competition, Purchasing, Turkey, 2006
- Bursa Terminal Square National Architectural Competition, Purchasing, Turkey, 2006
- Beylikduzu Cumhuriyet Street Design Architectural Competition, Mention, Turkey, 2006
- Bursa Kaplikaya Valley Landscape Design Competition, Purchasing, Turkey, 2006
- Uzundere Rekreation Valley Landscape Design Competition, 5th Mention, Turkey, 2006
- Izmit Historical Centre Urban Renewal Design Competition, 1st Mention, Turkey, 2005
- Van Besyol Time Square Design Competition, 3rd Award, Turkey, 2005
- Trabzon Kalkinma Downtown Landscape Design Project, Purchasing, Turkey, 2005
- Gaziosmanpasa City Hall And Environmental Design Competition, 2nd Award, Turkey, 2004
- ‘Former Fiume Veneto Cotton Mill Area’ International Competition, 9th Position, Turkey, 2004
- Izmit Basiskele Environmental Design Competition, 1st Award, Turkey, 2003
- Pananos Beach Landscape Design Competition, Purchasing, Turkey, 2003
- Ottoman Empire Memorial Park Competition, Purchasing, Turkey, 2002
- Damlatas Cave Restoration And Atatürk Park Competition, 1st Award, Turkey, 1999

== Selected projects ==
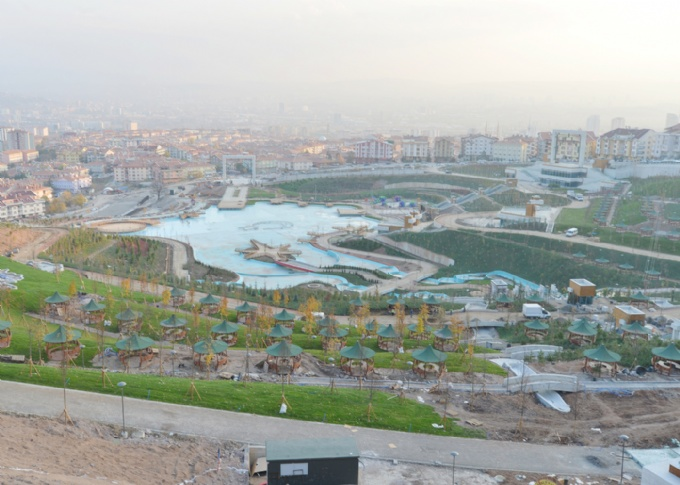
Esertepe Park, Ankara, Turkey

Europe

- Esertepe Park, Turkey, Ankara, 2014
- Information and Communication Technologies Authority Building design Turkey, Ankara, 2012
- Turkish Football Federation Riva Camp Landscape Design Project Turkey, Istanbul, 2014
- The Old Harbour Along With Örfirisey in Reykjavik, Reykjavik, Iceland, 2009
- La Spezia Arsenale 2062, Italy, 2014
- ifac2013 International Festival of Art & Construction, Spain, 2013

North America

- 3C: Comprehensive Coastal Communities, New York, USA, 2013
- ENVISION 2040, a Green Works Orlando, Orlando, USA, 2013
- Actıvate! Redefine Public Space in Chicago, USA, 2013
- Art In The Plaza, Minneapolis, USA, 2013
- Home For Humanity, San Francisco, USA, 2012
- LifeEdited Apartment #2Challenge, New York, USA, 2012
- Recconect Riverton Pedestrian Bridge, Canada, 2011
- Vancouver Viaducts & eastern core, re:CONNECT, Vancouver, Canada, 2011

Middle-East

- Regional Center for Educational Quality and Excellence, Jubail, Saudi Arabia, 2014

Africa

- A New Tahrir Square, Egypt, Cairo, 2011
- Urban Park Project, Libya, Sirte, 2009
- Cultural Center Environmental Design Project, Algeria, Oran, 2006
- Port Malabo Renewable Project, Equatorial Guinea, Malabo, 2003, Algeria, Oran, 2006

Asia Pacific

- Re-Thinking Shanghai 2012, China, Shanghai, 2012
- Future Living For Unstable Delta, Thailand, Bangkok, 2012
- Housing Complex, Landscape Design Project, Russia, Moskow, 2006
- Business Centre Design Project, Russia, Moskow, 2004
- Baku Bilgeh Estate, Azerbaijan, Baku, 2009
- Housing Complex Design Project, Turkmenistan, Ashkabat, 2001

Australia

- Green Civic Square, New Zealand, Hastings, 2012
- Hobart Waterfront Design Project, Tasmania, Hobart, 2007
