= Russian Silicon Valley =

Russian Silicon Valley may refer to:

- Zelenograd, Soviet/Russian center of electronics and microelectronics, which was developed as a reflection of the California Silicon Valley since 1962
- Skolkovo Innovation Center, Russian high technology business area near Moscow, which was announced in 2009
