= Esertepe Park =

Park in Ankara, Turkey

Ankara Esertepe Park
- Location within Turkey
- Location: Ankara, Turkey
- Coordinates: 39°59′17.16″N 32°49′53.00″E
- Area: 18.3 ha (45 acres)
- Created: 2015; 11 years ago

Esertepe Park (literally Esertepe Park) is a public park in Ankara, Turkey.

== Geography ==
The 18.3 ha (45 acres) park is at the northern part of Ankara. Its altitude changes between 985 m (3,232 ft) and 1,055 m (3,461 ft), which makes it one of the highest points in Ankara. It is surrounded by high density residential buildings of Etlik.

== History ==
During the early years of the Turkey, the site was used as an open air range by the Turkish Military. As the growth of the city of Ankara step by step site surrounded by the high density residential buildings. In 1970, Turkish Military stop using site as an open air range due to the safety precautions and left area unused. In 2013, Municipality of Ankara took the site and established Esertepe Park and opened to the public on 19 May 2015, the National Youth Day.
