= Silicon Valley of China =

Silicon Valley of China may refer to:

- Shenzhen, particularly its Nanshan District
- Zhongguancun, a technology hub in Haidian District, Beijing
