= List of Turkish architects =

The following is a list of notable Turkish architects in alphabetical order.

== A–M ==
- Ferhan Azman
- Emre Arolat
- Gökhan Avcıoğlu
- Turgut Cansever
- Alper Derinboğaz
- Sedad Hakkı Eldem
- Nail Çakırhan (1910–2008)
- Vedat Dalokay (1927–1991)
- Günay Erdem (born 1978)
- Sunay Erdem (born 1971)
- Mualla Eyüboğlu (1919–2009)
- Mimar Kemaleddin (1870–1927)
- Hakan Kıran (born 1962)
- Arif Hikmet Koyunoğlu (1888–1982)

== N–Z ==
- Emin Halid Onat (1908–1961)
- Zeki Sayar (1905–2000)
- Hilmi Şenalp (1957–)
- Şekip Akalın (1910–1976)
- Vedat Tek (1873–1942)
- Turgut Toydemir (1938–2024)

== See also ==
- Architecture of Turkey
- List of architects
- List of Turkish people
- Ottoman architecture
