= Güllük =

- Neighbourhood
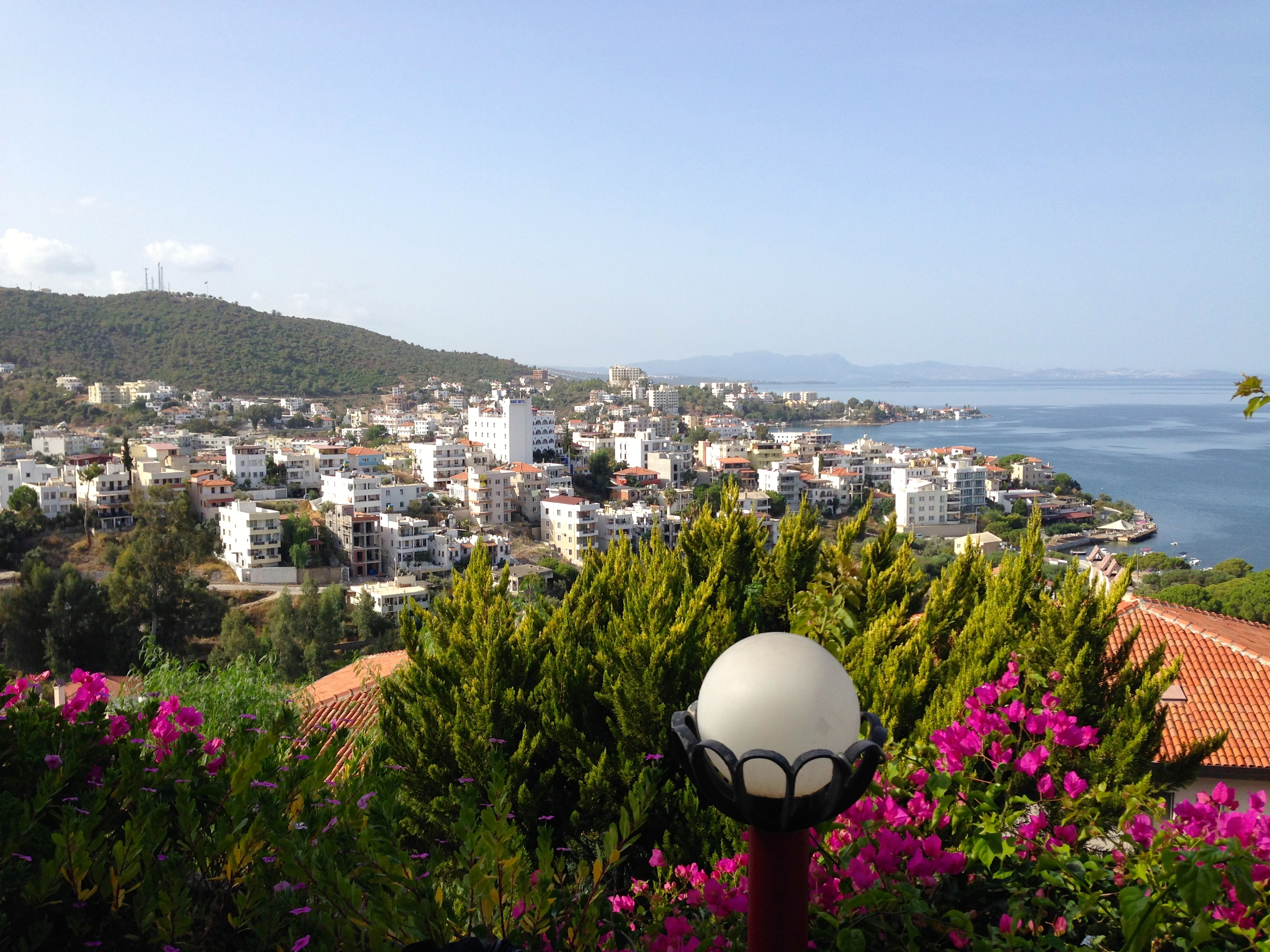
- View from NorthEast

- Location within Turkey Location within Turkey Aegean
- Coordinates: 37.24°N 27.6017°E
- Country: Turkey
- Province: Muğla
- District: Milas
- Population (2022): 6,866
- Time zone: UTC+3 (TRT)
- Postal code: 48200
- Area code: 0252

Güllük is a neighbourhood of the municipality and district of Milas, Muğla Province, Turkey. Its population is 6,866 (2022). Before the 2013 reorganisation, it was a town (belde). It is situated north of Bodrum. It is a small Turkish town and a growing holiday destination.

== Transport ==
Güllük is 9 km. from Milas-Bodrum Airport (BJV), which makes the town easily accessible. Bodrum is approximately 42 km. from Güllük. There are shuttle minivans connecting Güllük to Milas and Bodrum.

== See also ==
- Turkish Riviera
