= Sunay Erdem =

Turkish landscape architect

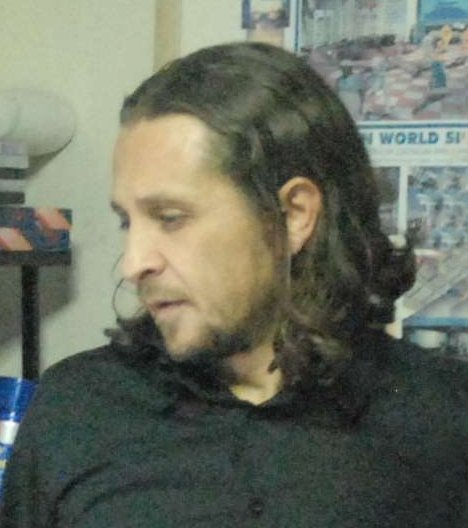
- Sunay Erdem in 2014
- Born: 17 March 1971 (age 55); Shumen, Bulgaria
- Occupation: Architect

Sunay Erdem (born 17 March 1971) is a Turkish landscape architect (by degree) and self-taught architect. Sunay Erdem founded Erdem Architects with his brother, Günay Erdem, in 1998.

Sunay Erdem designed many urban design projects in more than 40 different countries. Erdem has been using the free-hand sketching method since 1992 and he has more than 700 free-hand perspectives. His water colored sketch won the first prize in the 2013 Sketch Showdown Competition, Mixed Media which was organized by Philadelphia Center for Architecture. He won Turkish National Architecture Award in the category Presentation of Ideas (2010). Sunay Erdem also won the Turkish National Landscape Architecture Awards in 2009, 2010 and 2013 which were given by the Chamber of Landscape Architects in Turkey. One of the important projects developed by Sunay Erdem is the wall project for the US-Mexico border.

== Awards ==
Recognition Awards

- Turkish National Landscape Architecture Awards (2009, 2010 and 2013) which were given by Chamber of Landscape Architects in Turkey
- 2010 Turkish National Architecture Awards and Exhibition/Category: Presentation of Ideas
- Çanakkale 18 Mart University, Success Award, Turkey, 2011
- Landscape Architecture 4 Congress, Profession Contribution Award, Turkey, 2010
- Landscape Architecture 4 Congress, International Success Award, Turkey, 2010
- TSMD Success Award, Turkey, 2010
- Chamber Of Landscape Architects, Success Awards, Turkey, 2008

Awards in International Competitions

- La Spezia Arsenale 2062 Open Competition, Italy, Winner, 2014
- Regional Center for Educational Quality and Excellence Competition, Jubail, Saudi Arabia, 3rd Award, 2014
- ifac2013 International Festival of Art & Construction, Sunshade Competition, Spain, 1st Prize, 2013
- Actıvate! Desıgn Competition to Redefine Public Space in Chicago, USA Honorable Mention, 2013
- Sketch Showdown Competition, Mixed Media, Philadelphia, USA, Winner, 2013
- Home For Humanity Contest, San Francisco, USA, Winner, 2012
- LifeEdited Apartment #2Challenge Competition, New York, USA, Winner, 2012
- Recconect Riverton Pedestrian Bridge, Canada, Winner, 2011
- Vancouver Viaducts & eastern core, re:CONNECT An Open Ideas Competition, Vancouver, Canada, Winner, 2011
- The Old Harbour Along With Örfirisey in Reykjavik International Competition, Reykjavik, Iceland, Winner, 2009

Awards in National Competitions

- Elazig Education Campus, National Competition, Mention, Turkey, 2013
- Smart Sings Competition, Mention Award, Turkey, 2011
- Zonguldak Lavuar Conservation Area And The Surrounding Urban Design Competition, Purchasing, Turkey, 2010
- Memorial For The Sarikamis Operation National Architectural Competition, 3rd Award, Turkey, 2008
- Adana Ziyapasa District Urban Design Competition, Purchasing, Turkey, 2008
- Maltepe Regional Park Project Competition, 3rd Award, Turkey, 2007
- Diyarbakir Valley Landscape Planning And Urban Design Competition, 2nd Award, Turkey, 2007
- Teos Marina, 1st Project, Turkey, 2006
- Çeşme Marina, 1st Project, Turkey, 2006
- Kahramanmaras Town Hall Competition, 1st Purchasing, Turkey, 2006
- Balikesir Çamlik Park National Architectural Competition, Purchasing, Turkey, 2006
- Bursa Terminal Square National Architectural Competition, Purchasing, Turkey, 2006
- Beylikduzu Cumhuriyet Street Design Architectural Competition, Mention, Turkey, 2006
- Bursa Kaplikaya Valley Landscape Design Competition, Purchasing, Turkey, 2006
- Uzundere Rekreation Valley Landscape Design Competition, 5th Mention, Turkey, 2006
- Izmit Historical Centre Urban Renewal Design Competition, 1st Mention, Turkey, 2005
- Van Besyol Time Square Design Competition, 3rd Award, Turkey, 2005
- Trabzon Kalkinma Downtown Landscape Design Project, Purchasing, Turkey, 2005
- Gaziosmanpasa City Hall And Environmental Design Competition, 2nd Award, Turkey, 2004
- ‘Former Fiume Veneto Cotton Mill Area’ International Competition, 9th Position, Turkey, 2004
- Izmit Basiskele Environmental Design Competition, 1st Award, Turkey, 2003
- Pananos Beach Landscape Design Competition, Purchasing, Turkey, 2003
- Ottoman Empire Memorial Park Competition, Purchasing, Turkey, 2002
- Damlatas Cave Restoration And Atatürk Park Competition, 1st Award, Turkey, 1999

== Selected projects ==
- Esertepe Park (Ankara, 2014)

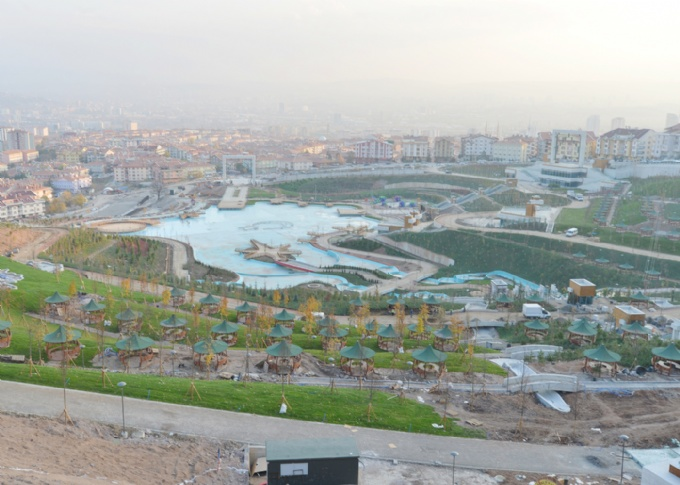
Esertepe Park, Ankara, Turkey
