= List of populated places in Karabük Province =

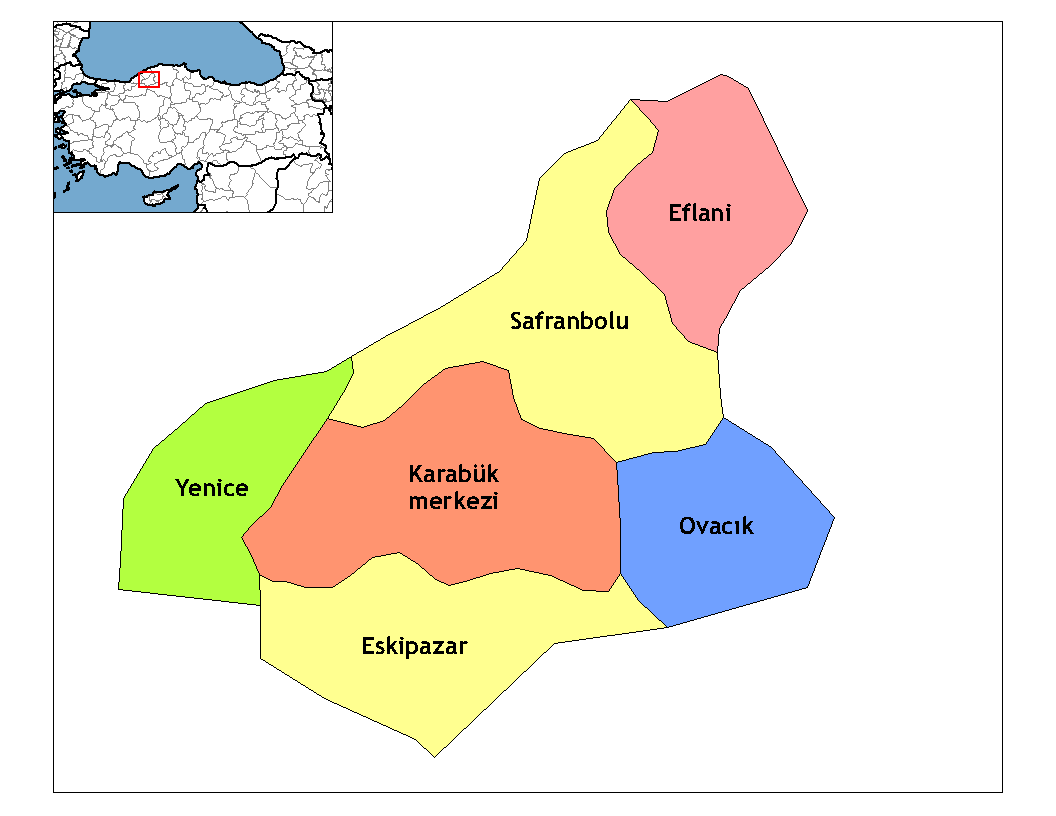
Karabük Province

Below is the list of populated places in Karabük Province, Turkey by the districts. In the following lists first place in each list is the administrative center of the district.

== Karabük ==
- Karabük
- Acıöz, Karabük
- Akören, Karabük
- Arıcak, Karabük
- Aşağı Kızılcaören, Karabük
- Başköy, Karabük
- Bolkuş, Karabük
- Bulak, Karabük
- Burunsuz, Karabük
- Bürnük, Karabük
- Cemaller, Karabük
- Cumayanı, Karabük
- Çukurca, Karabük
- Davutlar, Karabük
- Demirciler, Karabük
- Düzçam, Karabük
- Gölören, Karabük
- Güneşli, Karabük
- Kadı, Karabük
- Kahyalar, Karabük
- Kamış, Karabük
- Kapaklı, Karabük
- Karaağaç, Karabük
- Karaşar, Karabük
- Kayı, Karabük
- Kılavuzlar, Karabük
- Mehterler, Karabük
- Ortaca, Karabük
- Ödemiş, Karabük
- Saitler, Karabük
- Salmanlar, Karabük
- Sipahiler, Karabük
- Şenler, Karabük
- Tandır, Karabük
- Üçbaş, Karabük
- Yeşilköy, Karabük
- Yeşiltepe, Karabük
- Yukarı Kızılcaören, Karabük
- Zopran, Karabük

== Eflani ==
- Eflani
- Abakolu, Eflani
- Acıağaç, Eflani
- Aday, Eflani
- Afşar, Eflani
- Akçakese, Eflani
- Akören, Eflani
- Alaçat, Eflani
- Alpagut, Eflani
- Bağlıca, Eflani
- Bakırcılar, Eflani
- Başiğdir, Eflani
- Bedil, Eflani
- Bostancı, Eflani
- Bostancılar, Eflani
- Çal, Eflani
- Çamyurt, Eflani
- Çavuşlu, Eflani
- Çemçi, Eflani
- Çengeller, Eflani
- Çörekli, Eflani
- Çukurgelik, Eflani
- Çukurören, Eflani
- Demirli, Eflani
- Emirler, Eflani
- Esencik, Eflani
- Gelicek, Eflani
- Gökgöz, Eflani
- Göller, Eflani
- Güngören, Eflani
- Günlüce, Eflani
- Hacışaban, Eflani
- Halkevli, Eflani
- Karacapınar, Eflani
- Karataş, Eflani
- Karlı, Eflani
- Kavak, Eflani
- Kıran, Eflani
- Kocacık, Eflani
- Koltucak, Eflani
- Kutluören, Eflani
- Müftüler, Eflani
- Mülayim, Eflani
- Osmanlar, Eflani
- Ovaçalış, Eflani
- Ovaşeyhler, Eflani
- Paşabey, Eflani
- Pınarözü, Eflani
- Saçak, Eflani
- Saraycık, Eflani
- Seferler, Eflani
- Soğucak, Eflani
- Şenyurt, Eflani
- Ulugeçit, Eflani
- Yağlıca, Eflani

== Eskipazar ==
- Eskipazar
- Adiller, Eskipazar
- Arslanlar, Eskipazar
- Babalar, Eskipazar
- Başpınar, Eskipazar
- Bayındır, Eskipazar
- Belen, Eskipazar
- Beytarla, Eskipazar
- Boncuklar, Eskipazar
- Bölükören, Eskipazar
- Budaklar, Eskipazar
- Bulduk, Eskipazar
- Büyükyayalar, Eskipazar
- Çandırlar, Eskipazar
- Çaylı, Eskipazar
- Deresemail, Eskipazar
- Deresoblan, Eskipazar
- Doğancılar, Eskipazar
- Doğlacık, Eskipazar
- Gömlekçiler, Eskipazar
- Gözlü, Eskipazar
- Hamamlı, Eskipazar
- Hamzalar, Eskipazar
- Hanköy, Eskipazar
- Hasanlar, Eskipazar
- Haslı, Eskipazar
- İmanlar, Eskipazar
- İnceboğaz, Eskipazar
- Kabaarmut, Eskipazar
- Kapaklı, Eskipazar
- Kapucular, Eskipazar
- Karahasanlar, Eskipazar
- Karaören, Eskipazar
- Köyceğiz, Eskipazar
- Kulat, Eskipazar
- Kuzören, Eskipazar
- Ortaköy, Eskipazar
- Ova, Eskipazar
- Ozanköy, Eskipazar
- Sadeyaka, Eskipazar
- Sallar, Eskipazar
- Sofular, Eskipazar
- Söbüçimen, Eskipazar
- Şevkiler, Eskipazar
- Tamuşlar, Eskipazar
- Topçalı, Eskipazar
- Yazıboy, Eskipazar
- Yazıkavak, Eskipazar
- Yeşiller, Eskipazar
- Yürecik, Eskipazar

== Ovacık ==
- Ovacık
- Abdullar, Ovacık
- Ahmetler, Ovacık
- Alınca, Ovacık
- Ambarözü, Ovacık
- Avlağıkaya, Ovacık
- Başboyunduruk, Ovacık
- Belen, Ovacık
- Beydili, Ovacık
- Beydini, Ovacık
- Boduroğlu, Ovacık
- Boyalı, Ovacık
- Bölükören, Ovacık
- Çatak, Ovacık
- Çukur, Ovacık
- Doğanlar, Ovacık
- Dökecek, Ovacık
- Dudaş, Ovacık
- Ekincik, Ovacık
- Erkeç, Ovacık
- Ganibeyler, Ovacık
- Gökçedüz, Ovacık
- Gümelik, Ovacık
- Güneysaz, Ovacık
- Hatipoğlu, Ovacık
- İmanlar, Ovacık
- Kavaklar, Ovacık
- Kışla, Ovacık
- Koltuk, Ovacık
- Küçüksu, Ovacık
- Pelitçik, Ovacık
- Pürçükören, Ovacık
- Sarılar, Ovacık
- Sofuoğlu, Ovacık
- Soğanlı, Ovacık
- Sülük, Ovacık
- Şamlar, Ovacık
- Taşoğlu, Ovacık
- Yaka, Ovacık
- Yaylacılar, Ovacık
- Yeniören, Ovacık
- Yığınot, Ovacık
- Yürekören, Ovacık

== Safranbolu ==
- Safranbolu
- Ağaçkese, Safranbolu
- Akören, Safranbolu
- Alören, Safranbolu
- Aşağıçiftlik, Safranbolu
- Aşağıdana, Safranbolu
- Aşağıgüney, Safranbolu
- Bağcığaz, Safranbolu
- Bostanbükü, Safranbolu
- Cücahlı, Safranbolu
- Çatak, Safranbolu
- Çavuşlar, Safranbolu
- Çerçen, Safranbolu
- Çıraklar, Safranbolu
- Davutobası, Safranbolu
- Değirmencik, Safranbolu
- Dere, Safranbolu
- Düzce, Safranbolu
- Geren, Safranbolu
- Gökpınar, Safranbolu
- Gündoğan, Safranbolu
- Hacılarobası, Safranbolu
- Harmancık, Safranbolu
- İnceçay, Safranbolu
- İncekaya, Safranbolu
- Kadıbükü, Safranbolu
- Karacatepe, Safranbolu
- Karapınar, Safranbolu
- Karıt, Safranbolu
- Kehler, Safranbolu
- Kırıklar, Safranbolu
- Konarı, Safranbolu
- Kuzyakahacılar, Safranbolu
- Kuzyakaköseler, Safranbolu
- Kuzyakaöte, Safranbolu
- Navsaklar, Safranbolu
- Nebioğlu, Safranbolu
- Oğulören, Safranbolu
- Ovacuma, Safranbolu
- Örencik, Safranbolu
- Pelitören, Safranbolu
- Sakaralan, Safranbolu
- Sarıahmetli, Safranbolu
- Sat, Safranbolu
- Sırçalı, Safranbolu
- Sine, Safranbolu
- Tayyip, Safranbolu
- Tokatlı, Safranbolu
- Toprakcuma, Safranbolu
- Üçbölük, Safranbolu
- Yazıköy, Safranbolu
- Yolbaşı, Safranbolu
- Yörük, Safranbolu
- Yukarıçiftlik, Safranbolu
- Yukarıdana, Safranbolu

== Yenice ==
- Yenice
- Abdullahoğlu, Yenice
- Akmanlar, Yenice
- Bağbaşı, Yenice
- Cihanbey, Yenice
- Çakıllar, Yenice
- Çamlı, Yenice
- Çeltik, Yenice
- Değirmenyanı, Yenice
- Derebaşı, Yenice
- Esenköy, Yenice
- Gökbel, Yenice
- Güney, Yenice
- Hisar, Yenice
- Hüseyinbeyoğlu, Yenice
- Ibrıcak, Yenice
- Kadıköy, Yenice
- Kale, Yenice
- Karahasanlar, Yenice
- Kayaarkası, Yenice
- Kayadibi, Yenice
- Keyfallar, Yenice
- Kuzdağ, Yenice
- Nodullar, Yenice
- Ören, Yenice
- Saray, Yenice
- Satuk, Yenice
- Şenköy, Yenice
- Şirinköy, Yenice
- Tir, Yenice
- Yamaçköy, Yenice
- Yazıköy, Yenice
- Yeniköy, Yenice
- Yeşilköy, Yenice
- Yirmibeşoğlu, Yenice
- Yortan, Yenice
