= Karabük (disambiguation) =

Karabük is a city in the Black Sea region of Turkey.

Karabük may also refer to:

- Karabük Province, a province in northern Anatolia, Turkey
- Karabük District or Merkez, a district of Karabük Province, Turkey
- Karabük (electoral district), a constituency of the Grand National Assembly of Turkey
- Karabük, Kovancılar or Karabörk, a village in Elazığ Province, Turkey
- Karabük, Manavgat, a neighbourhood in Antalya Province, Turkey
- Karabük, Şereflikoçhisar, a neighbourhood in Ankara Province, Turkey
- Karabük, Taşova, a village in Amasya Province, Turkey
- Karabük, Vezirköprü, a neighbourhood in Samsun Province, Turkey
