= Derebaşı =

Derebaşı may refer to:

In Turkey, by province:

- Aydın Province
  - Derebaşı, Nazilli, village in Nazilli district
- Erzincan Province
  - Derebaşı, Refahiye
- Erzurum Province
  - Derebaşı, Köprüköy
  - Derebaşı, Oltu
- İzmir Province, see populated places in İzmir Province
  - Derebaşı, Tire, village in Tire district
- Karabük Province, see populated places in Karabük Province
  - Derebaşı, Yenice, village in Yenice district
- Mersin Province
  - Derebaşı, Bozyazı, village in Bıozyazı district
- Ordu Province, see populated places in Ordu Province
  - Derebaşı, İkizce, village in İkizce district
  - Derebaşı, Mesudiye, village in Mesudiye district
- Rize Province, see populated places in Rize Province
  - Derebaşı, Rize, village in central district of Rize Province
- Şırnak Province
  - Derebaşı, village near Mount Judi
