= Ovacık =

Ovacık (literally "little plains" or "little lowlands" in Turkish) may refer to the following places in Turkey:

== Districts ==
- Ovacık District, Karabük, a district of Karabük Province
- Ovacık District, Tunceli, a district of Tunceli Province

== Municipalities ==
- Ovacık, Karabük, a small town in Karabük Province
- Ovacık, Tunceli, a town in Tunceli Province

== Villages ==
- Ovacık, Ardanuç, a village in the district of Ardanuç, Artvin Province
- Ovacık, Aşkale
- Ovacık, Başmakçı, a village in the district of Başmakçı, Afyonkarahisar Province
- Ovacık, Biga
- Ovacık, Çanakkale
- Ovacık, Çankırı
- Ovacık, Çine, a village in the district of Çine, Aydın Province
- Ovacık, Çubuk, a village in the district of Çubuk, Ankara Province
- Ovacık, Elmalı, a village in the district of Elmalı, Antalya Province
- Ovacık, Fethiye, a village in the district of Fethiye, Muğla Province
- Ovacık, Honaz
- Ovacık, Kahta, a village in the district of Kahta, Adıyaman Province
- Ovacık, Kemer, a village in the district of Kemer, Antalya Province
- Ovacık, Kuyucak, a village in the district of Kuyucak, Aydın Province
- Ovacık, Lüleburgaz, a village in the district of Lüleburgaz, Kırklareli Province
- Ovacık, Nazilli, a village in the district of Nazilli, Aydın Province
- Ovacık, Samsat, a village in the district of Samsat, Adıyaman Province
- Ovacık, Silifke, a village in the district of Silifke, Mersin Province
- Ovacık, Tavas
- Ovacık, Vezirköprü, a village in the district of Vezirköprü, Samsun Province
- Ovacık, Yapraklı

== See also ==
- Yeşilovacık, a town in the district of Silifke, Mersin Province, Turkey
