= Yortan =

- Municipality
- Location within Turkey
- Coordinates: 41°15′N 32°21′E
- Country: Turkey
- Province: Karabük
- District: Yenice
- Elevation: 250 m (820 ft)
- Population (2022): 1,689
- Time zone: UTC+3 (TRT)
- Postal code: 78720
- Area code: 0370

Yortan (formerly: Yortanpazarı) is a town (belde) in the Yenice District, Karabük Province, Turkey. Its population is 1,689 (2022). The town is situated in forests along a tributary of the Filyos River. The distance to Yenice is 9 kilometres (5.6 mi). There are several theories about the name of the town. It may refer to jars used as sepulcher in the ancient ages, sheep pens of Turkmens or feasts of Greeks of the medieval ages. The majority of Yortan people make their living as miners. According to mayor, Yortan has the highest percentage of mining-related accident or deaths for the total population in Turkey.
