= Kılavuzlar =

Kılavuzlar may refer to the following settlements in Turkey:

- Kılavuzlar, Bozdoğan, a neighbourhood in Aydın Province
- Kılavuzlar, Göynük, a village in Bolu Provinc
- Kılavuzlar, Karabük, a neighbourhood of Karabük Province
- Kılavuzlar, Karamanlı, a village in Burdur Province
- Kılavuzlar, Sultanhisar, a neighbourhood in Aydın Province
