= Kılavuzlar, Karabük =

Kılavuzlar
- Neighbourhood
- Location in Turkey
- Coordinates: 41°13′N 32°40′E
- Country: Turkey
- Province: Karabük
- District: Karabük
- Municipality: Karabük
- Elevation: 360 m (1,180 ft)
- Population (2022): 5,137
- Time zone: UTC+3 (TRT)
- Postal code: 78000
- Area code: 0370

Kılavuzlar is a neighbourhood of the town Karabük, Karabük District, Karabük Province, Turkey. Its population is 5,137 (2022). The village is situated between Karabük and Safranbolu. The Araç creek is to the south of the village. The distance to Karabük is 6 kilometres (3.7 mi). The village economy depends on vegetable and fruit gardening.
