= Eflani =

- Municipality
- Location within Turkey
- Coordinates: 41°25′23″N 32°57′22″E
- Country: Turkey
- Province: Karabük
- District: Eflani
- Elevation: 897 m (2,943 ft)
- Population (2022): 2,076
- Time zone: UTC+3 (TRT)
- Area code: 0370
- Climate: Cfb
- Website: www.eflani.bel.tr

Eflani is a town in Karabük Province in the Black Sea region of Turkey. It is the seat of Eflani District. Its population is 2,076 (2022). Eflani is located at 100 km south of the Black Sea. 46 km away from, and to the east of Karabük, it is settled on a plateau divided by small rivers among the high mountains and valleys. The town lies at an elevation of 897 m (2,943 ft).

== Image gallery ==
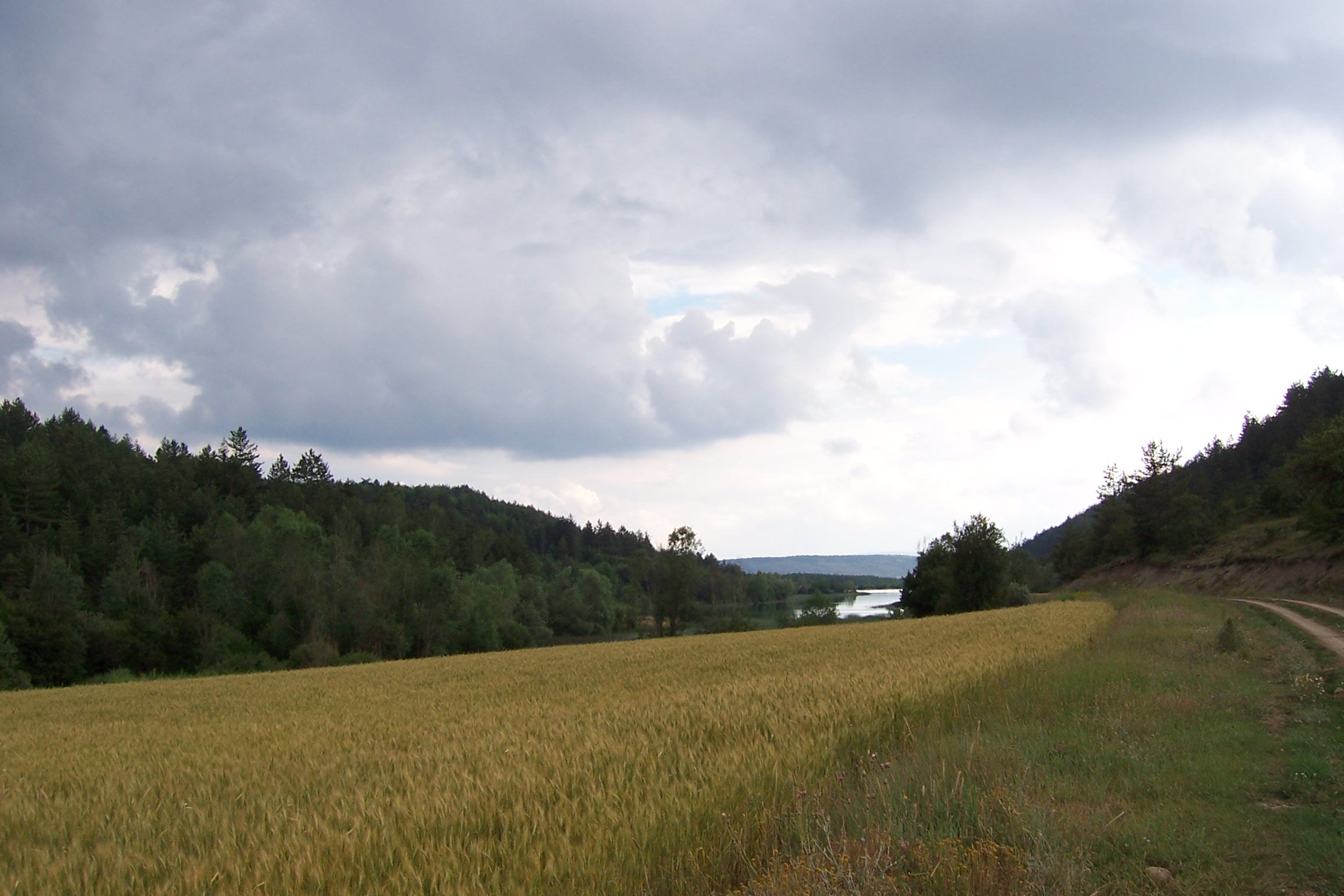
On the way to Lake Bostancı

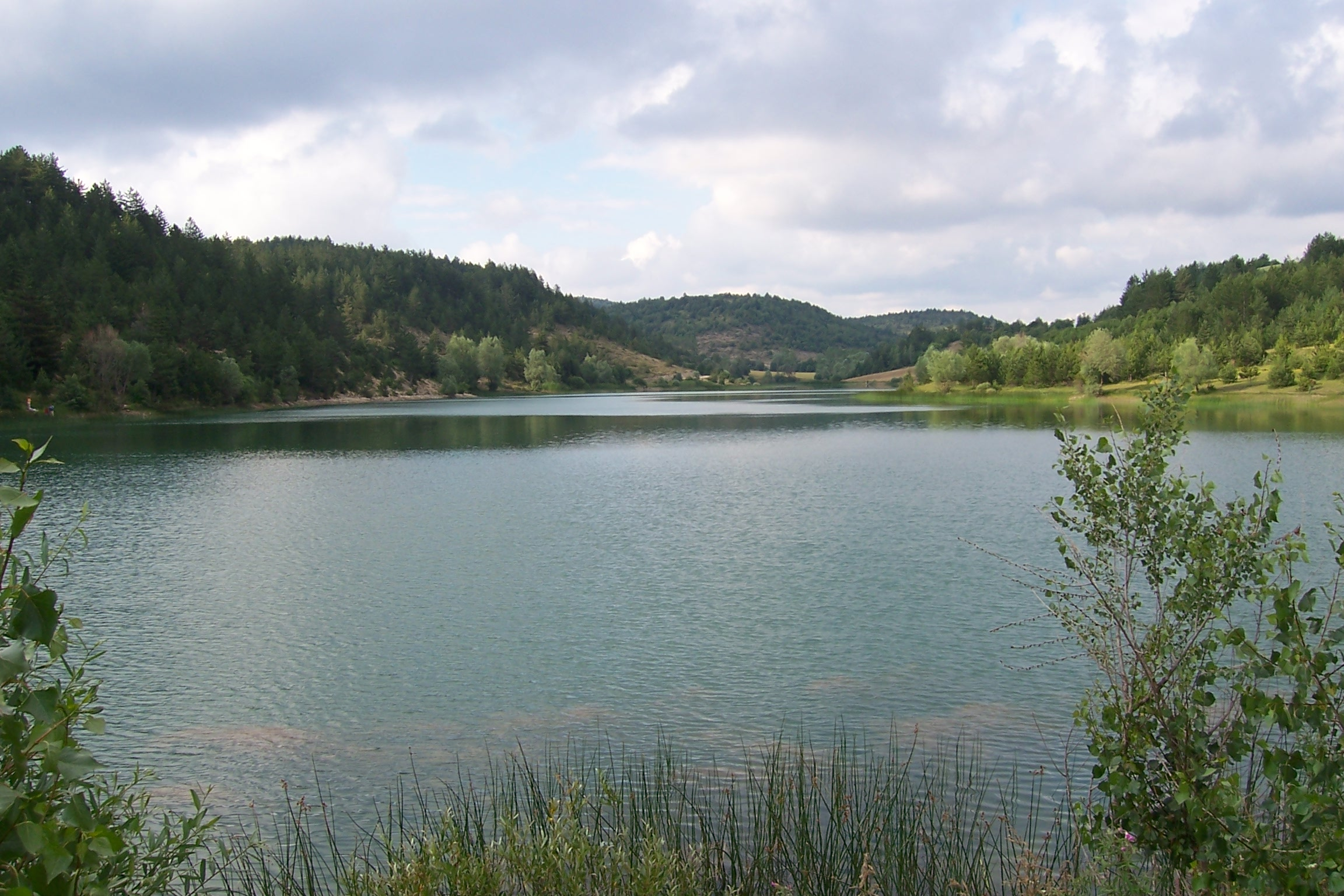
A panorama of Lake Bostancı
