= Eflani District =

District of Karabük Province, Turkey

- District
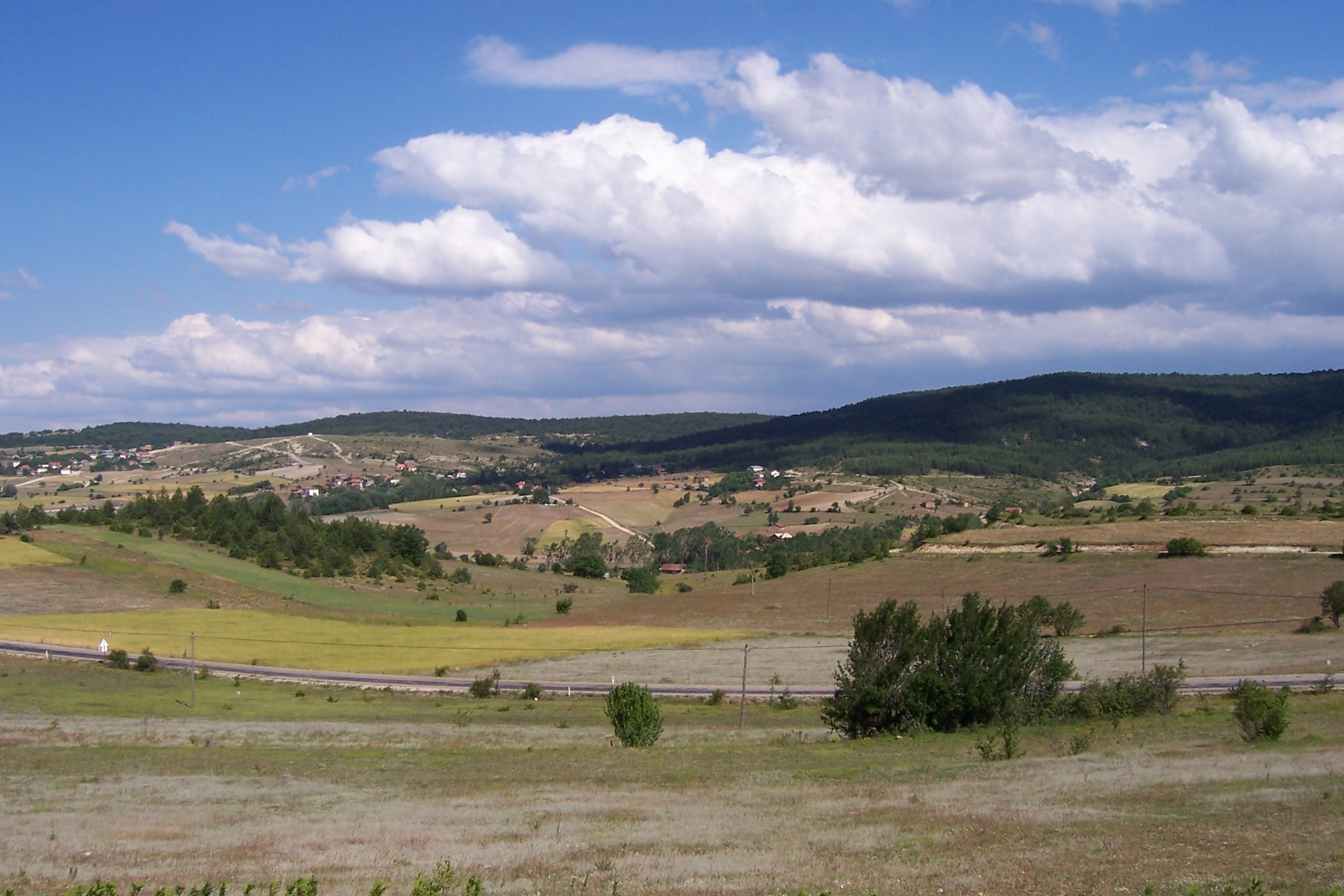

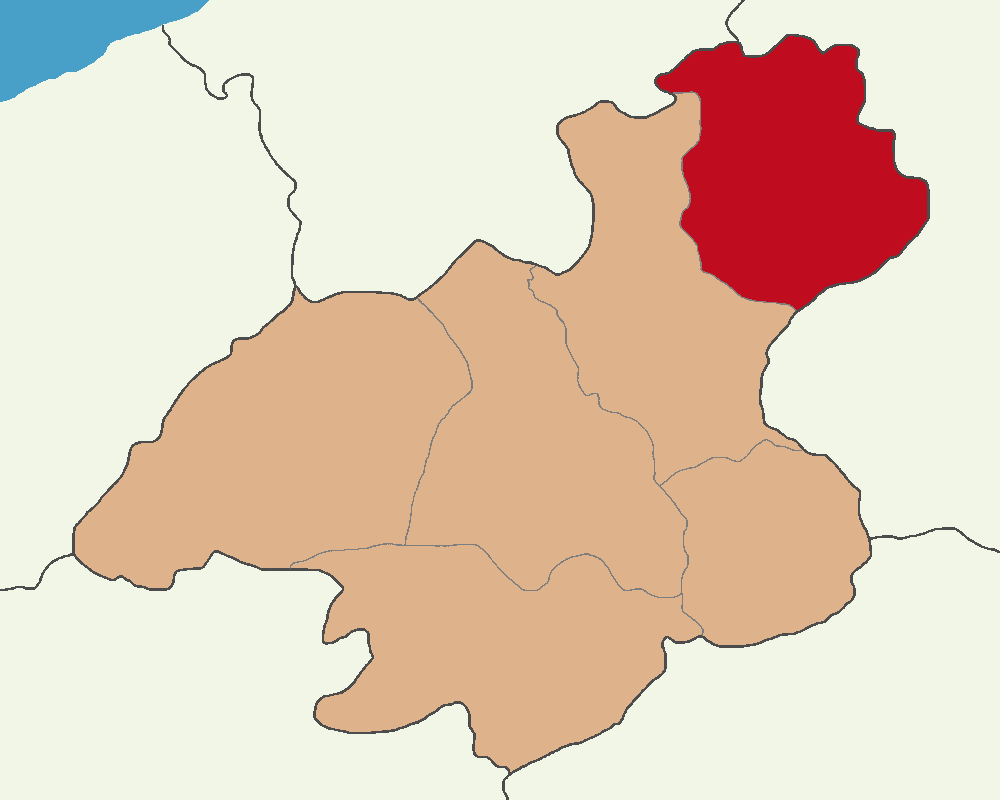
- Map showing Eflani District in Karabük Province

- Location within Turkey
- Coordinates: 41°25′N 32°57′E
- Country: Turkey
- Province: Karabük
- Seat: Eflani

Government
  - Kaymakam: Gizem Tokur
- Area: 674 km^{2} (260 sq mi)
- Population (2022): 8,352
  - Density: 12.4/km^{2} (32.1/sq mi)
- Time zone: UTC+3 (TRT)
- Website: www.eflani.gov.tr

Eflani District is a district of the Karabük Province of Turkey. Its seat is the town of Eflani. Its area is 674 km^{2}, and its population is 8,352 (2022).

== Composition ==
There is one municipality in Eflani District:

- Eflani

There are 54 villages in Eflani District:

- Abakolu
- Aday
- Afşar
- Akçakese
- Akören
- Alaçat
- Alpagut
- Bağlıca
- Bakırcılar
- Başiğdir
- Bedil
- Bostancı
- Bostancılar
- Çalköy
- Çamyurt
- Çavuşlu
- Çemçi
- Çengeller
- Çörekli
- Çukurgelik
- Çukurören
- Demirli
- Emirler
- Esencik
- Gelicek
- Gökgöz
- Göller
- Güngören
- Günlüce
- Hacıağaç
- Hacışaban
- Halkevleri
- Karacapınar
- Karataş
- Karlı
- Kavak
- Kıran
- Kocacık
- Koltucak
- Kutluören
- Müftüler
- Mülayim
- Osmanlar
- Ovaçalış
- Ovaşeyhler
- Paşabey
- Pınarözü
- Saçak
- Saraycık
- Seferler
- Şenyurt
- Soğucak
- Ulugeçit
- Yağlıca
