= Yenice District, Karabük =

District of Karabük Province, Turkey

Yenice District
- District
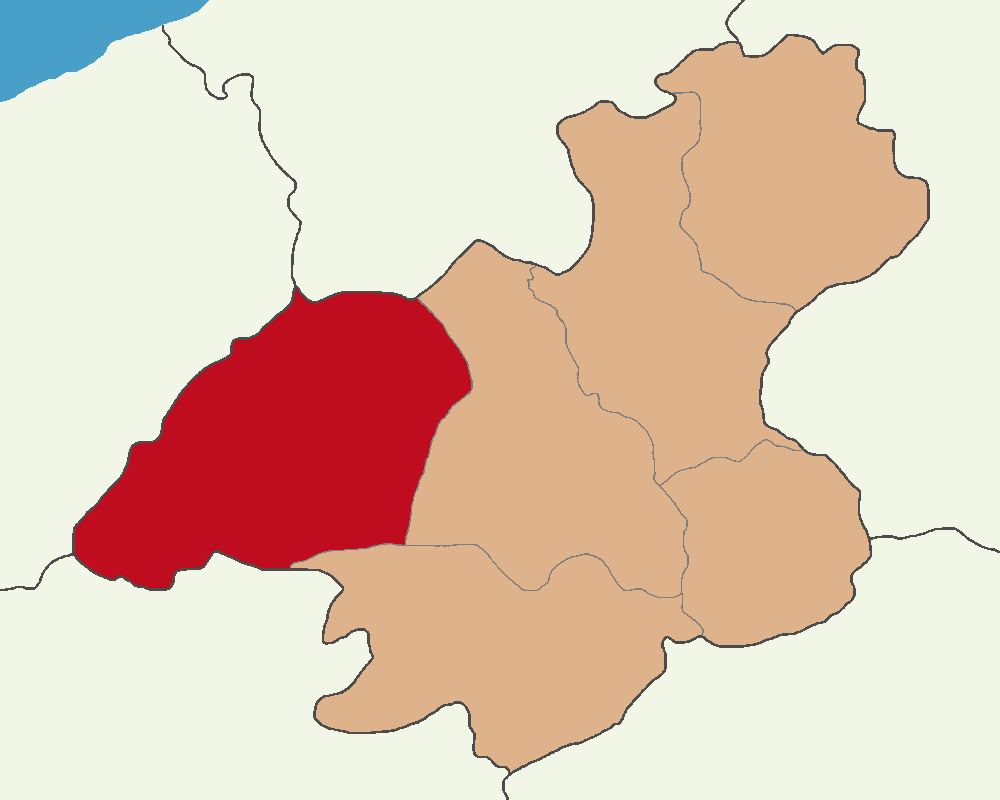
- Map showing Yenice District in Karabük Province

- Location in Turkey
- Coordinates: 41°12′N 32°20′E
- Country: Turkey
- Province: Karabük
- Seat: Yenice

Government
  - Kaymakam: Büşra Güneş
- Area: 777 km^{2} (300 sq mi)
- Population (2022): 19,371
  - Density: 25/km^{2} (65/sq mi)
- Time zone: UTC+3 (TRT)
- Website: www.yenice.gov.tr

Yenice District is a district of the Karabük Province of Turkey. Its seat is the town of Yenice. Its area is 777 km^{2}, and its population is 19,371 (2022).

== Composition ==
There are two municipalities in Yenice District:

- Yenice
- Yortan

There are 34 villages in Yenice District:

- Abdullahoğlu
- Akmanlar
- Bağbaşı
- Çakıllar
- Çamlıköy
- Çeltik
- Cihanbey
- Değirmenyanı
- Derebaşı
- Esenköy
- Gökbel
- Güney
- Hisarköy
- Hüseyinbeyoğlu
- Ibrıcak
- Kadıköy
- Kale
- Karahasanlar
- Kayaarkası
- Kayadibi
- Keyfallar
- Kuzdağ
- Nodullar
- Ören
- Saray
- Satuk
- Şenköy
- Şirinköy
- Tirköy
- Yamaçköy
- Yazıköy
- Yeniköy
- Yeşilköy
- Yirmibeşoğlu
