= Cumayanı, Karabük =

Cumayanı
- Village
- Location within Turkey
- Coordinates: 41°06′N 32°40′E
- Country: Turkey
- Province: Karabük
- District: Karabük
- Elevation: 360 m (1,180 ft)
- Population (2022): 2,931
- Time zone: UTC+3 (TRT)
- Postal code: 78000
- Area code: 0370

Cumayanı is a village in the Karabük District of Karabük Province, Turkey. Its population is 2,931 (2022). The village is situated on Turkish state highway D.755. The distance to Karabük is 15 kilometres (9.3 mi). The village was founded recently. But there is an old mosque in the village which was an authorized to be the gathering place for the Friday prayers during the Ottoman Empire and the name of the village refers to Friday prayers (In Turkish Cuma means Friday)
