= Başiğdir =

- Village
- Location within Turkey
- Coordinates: 41°23′N 33°04′E
- Country: Turkey
- Province: Karabük
- District: Eflani
- Population (2022): 89
- Time zone: UTC+3 (TRT)

Başiğdir is a village in the Eflani District, Karabük Province, Black Sea Region of Turkey. Its population is 89 (2022).
