= Filyos River =

River in Turkey

Coordinates: 41°25′28″N 32°5′14″E

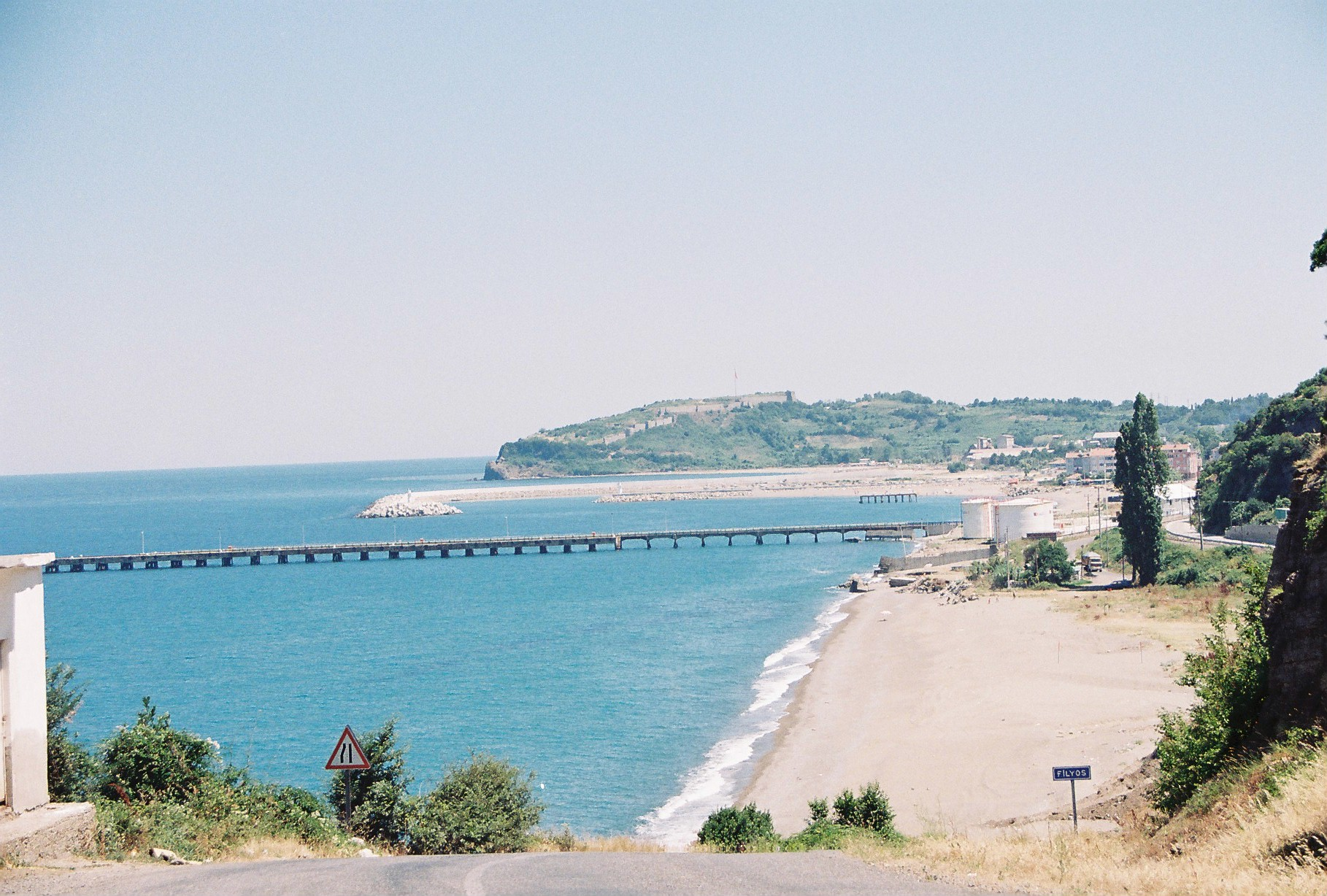
Filyos Bay, Zonguldak, Turkey

The Filyos River is a river in northern Turkey.

The longest branch of the Filyos is formed near Karabük by several tributaries. It flows to the west through a deep canyon past Yenice. Just north of Devrek, it is joined by major branches flowing from the south and southwest, and then flows north past Beycuma and Çaycuma to reach the Black Sea. The mouth of the river is just east of the modern town of Filyos, in Zonguldak Province.

The Yedigöller National Park lies in the headwaters of the southern branch of the Filyos River.

On 7 April 2012, a bridge over the river at Çaycuma collapsed and several people were killed.

The Filyos River was known in Classical Greece as the Billaeus River.
