= Yenice, Karabük =

Yenice
- Municipality
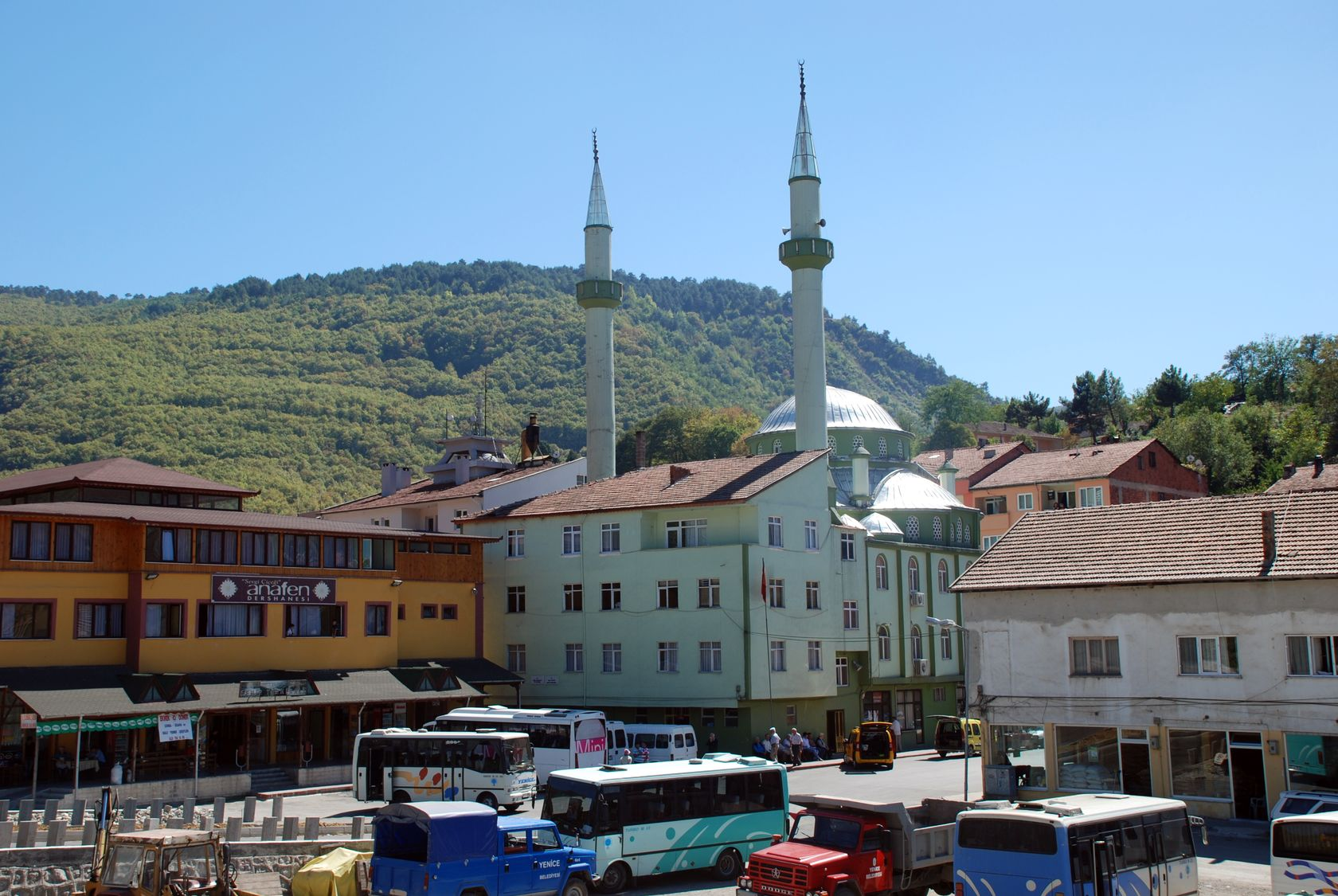

- Location within Turkey
- Coordinates: 41°12′00″N 32°19′45″E
- Country: Turkey
- Province: Karabük
- District: Yenice

Government
  - Mayor: Sertaş Karakaş (AKP)
- Elevation: 444 m (1,457 ft)
- Population (2022): 9,038
- Time zone: UTC+3 (TRT)
- Area code: 0370
- Climate: Cfa
- Website: www.karabukyenice.bel.tr

Yenice, also Çeltik, is a town in Karabük Province in the Black Sea region of Turkey. It is the seat of Yenice District. Its population is 9,038 (2022). The town lies at an elevation of 444 m (1,457 ft).
