= Ovacık District, Karabük =

District of Karabük Province, Turkey

Ovacık District
- District
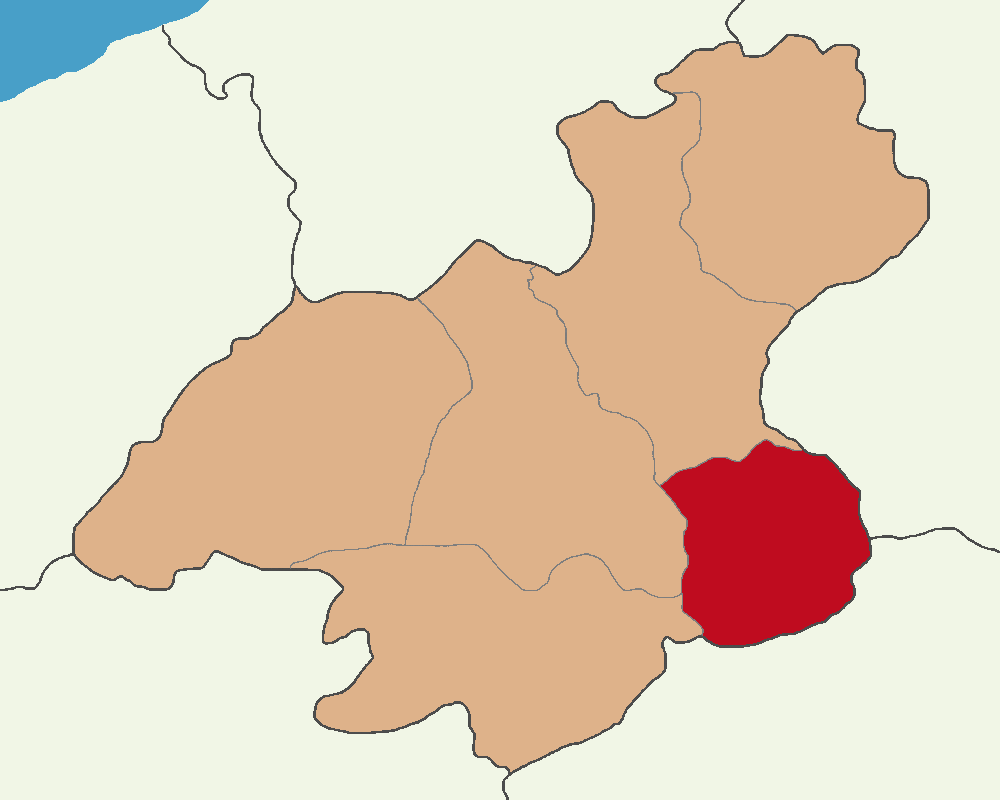
- Map showing Ovacık District in Karabük Province

- Location in Turkey
- Coordinates: 41°05′N 32°55′E
- Country: Turkey
- Province: Karabük
- Seat: Ovacık

Government
  - Kaymakam: Bahadır Yılmaz
- Area: 398 km^{2} (154 sq mi)
- Population (2022): 3,731
  - Density: 9.37/km^{2} (24.3/sq mi)
- Time zone: UTC+3 (TRT)
- Website: www.ovacik.gov.tr

Ovacık District is a district of the Karabük Province of Turkey. Its seat is the town of Ovacık. Its area is 398 km^{2}, and its population is 3,731 (2022). It is the smallest district in Karabük Province, both by area and by population.

== Composition ==
There is one municipality in Ovacık District:

- Ovacık

There are 42 villages in Ovacık District:

- Abdullar
- Ahmetler
- Alınca
- Ambarözü
- Avlağıkaya
- Başboyunduruk
- Belen
- Beydili
- Beydini
- Boduroğlu
- Boyalı
- Bölükören
- Çatak
- Çukurköy
- Doğanlar
- Dökecek
- Dudaş
- Ekincik
- Erkeç
- Ganibeyler
- Gökçedüz
- Gümelik
- Güneysaz
- Hatipoğlu
- İmanlar
- Kavaklar
- Kışlaköy
- Koltuk
- Küçüksu
- Pelitçik
- Pürçükören
- Şamlar
- Sarılar
- Sofuoğlu
- Soğanlı
- Sülük
- Taşoğlu
- Yakaköy
- Yaylacılar
- Yeniören
- Yığınot
- Yürekören
