= Ovacık, Karabük =

Ovacık
- Municipality
- Location within Turkey
- Coordinates: 41°04′34″N 32°55′19″E
- Country: Turkey
- Province: Karabük
- District: Ovacık

Government
  - Mayor: Ahmet Şahin (AKP)
- Elevation: 1,100 m (3,600 ft)
- Population (2022): 573
- Time zone: UTC+3 (TRT)
- Area code: 0370
- Climate: Cfb
- Website: www.ovacik.bel.tr

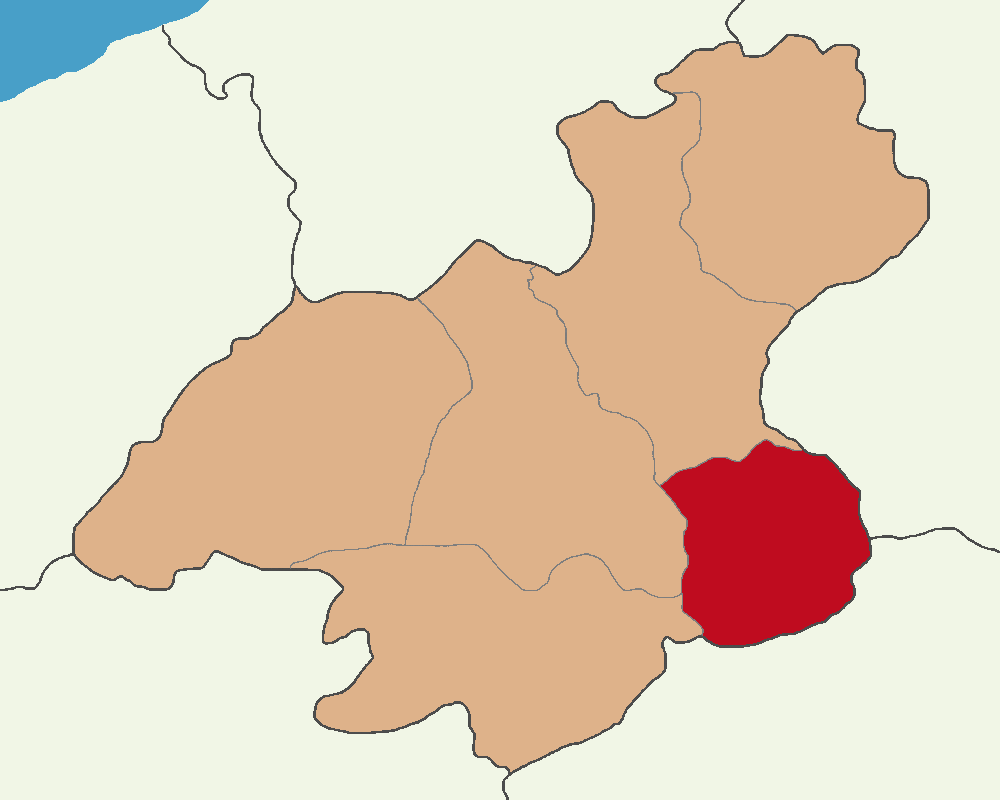
Map of Ovacık

Ovacık is a town in Karabük Province in the Black Sea region of Turkey. It is the seat of Ovacık District. Its population is 573 (2022). The town lies at an elevation of 1,100 m (3,609 ft). It was a town in Çerkeş District between 1923-1957 and was a district town in Çankırı Province between 1957 and 1995.
