= Karabük District =

District of Karabük Province, Turkey

- District
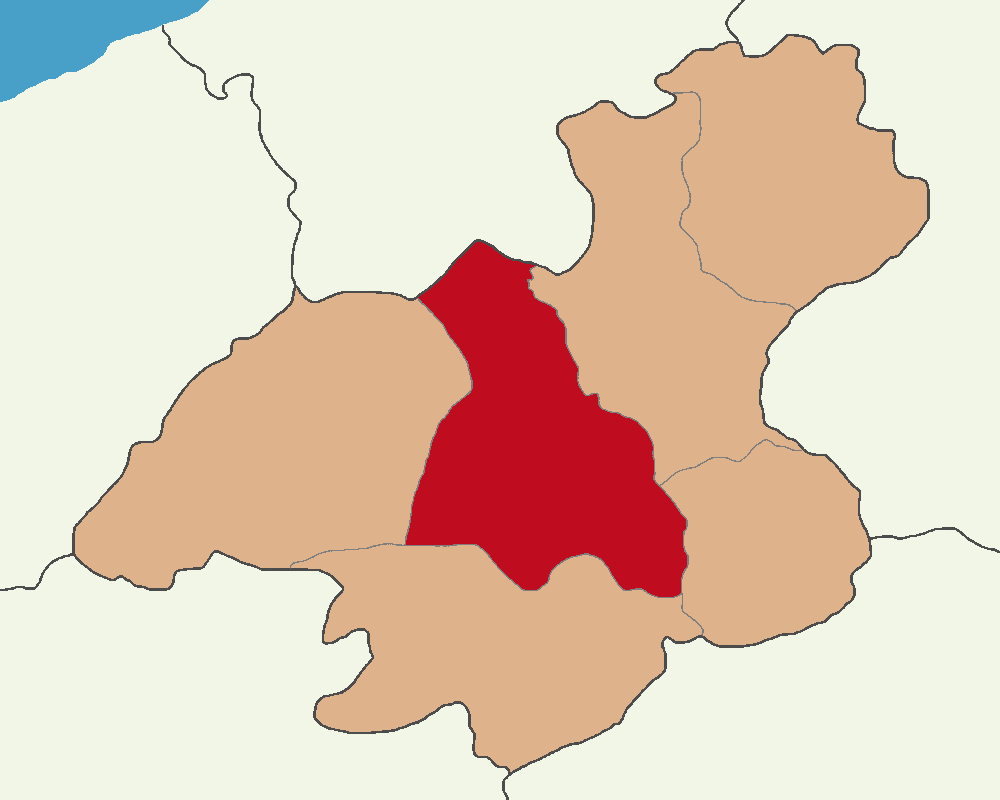
- Map showing Karabük District in Karabük Province

- Location in Turkey
- Coordinates: 41°12′N 32°38′E
- Country: Turkey
- Province: Karabük
- Seat: Karabük
- Area: 790 km^{2} (310 sq mi)
- Population (2022): 137,428
  - Density: 170/km^{2} (450/sq mi)
- Time zone: UTC+3 (TRT)

Karabük District (also: Merkez, meaning "central" in Turkish) is a district of the Karabük Province of Turkey. Its seat is the city of Karabük. Its area is 790 km^{2}, and its population is 137,428 (2022).

== Composition ==
There is one municipality in Karabük District:

- Karabük

There are 37 villages in Karabük District:

- Acıöz
- Arıcak
- Aşağıkızılcaören
- Başköy
- Bolkuş
- Bulak
- Bürnük
- Burunsuz
- Cemaller
- Çukurca
- Cumayanı
- Davutlar
- Demirciler
- Düzçam
- Gölören
- Güneşli
- Kadıköy
- Kahyalar
- Kale
- Kamışköy
- Kapaklı
- Karaağaç
- Karaşar
- Kayı
- Mehterler
- Ödemiş
- Ortaca
- Saitler
- Salmanlar
- Şenler
- Sipahiler
- Tandır
- Üçbaş
- Yeşilköy
- Yeşiltepe
- Yukarıkızılcaören
- Zopran
