= Karabük =

- Municipality
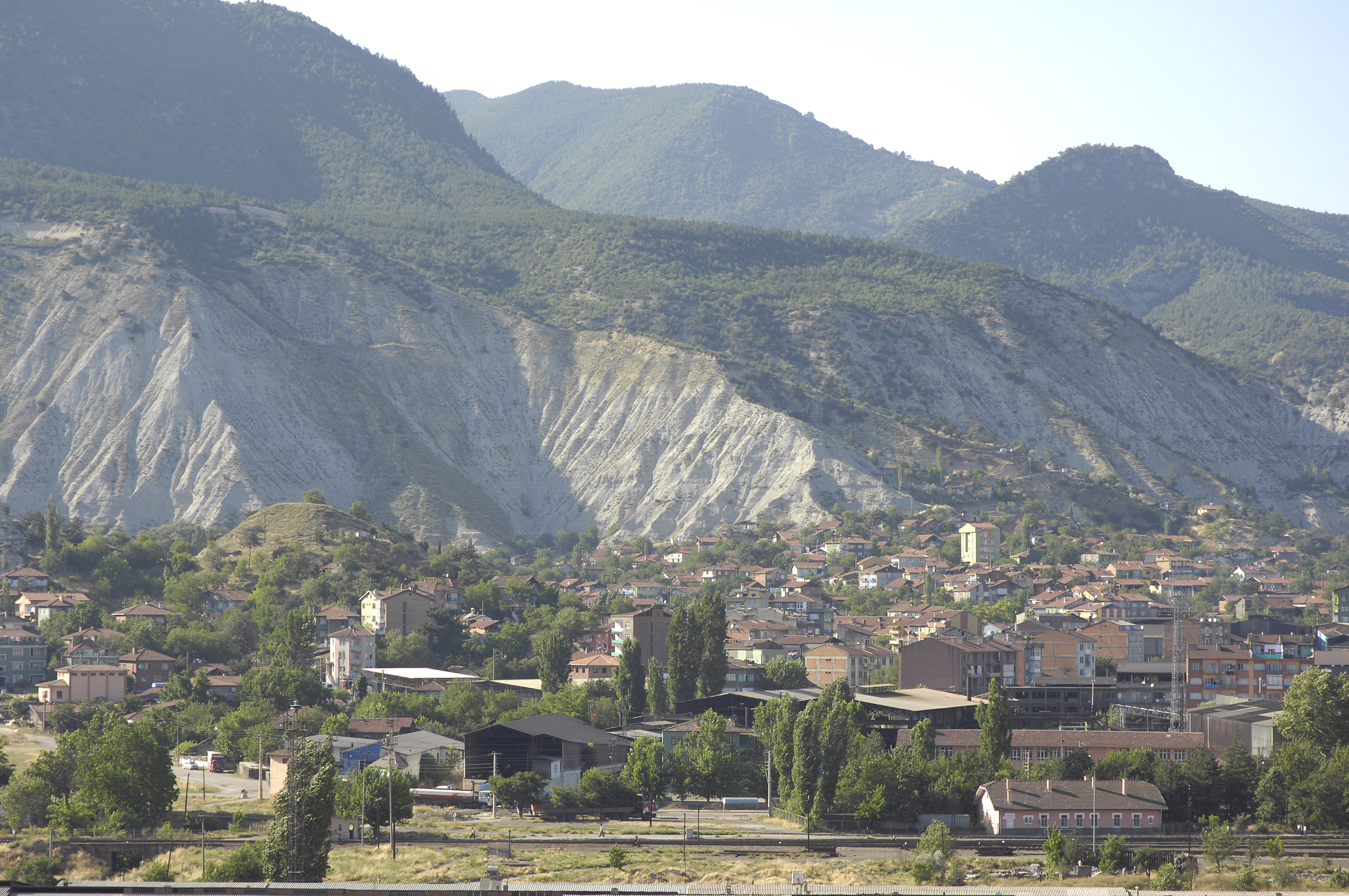

- Coat of arms

- Location within Turkey
- Coordinates: 41°11′55″N 32°37′35″E
- Country: Turkey
- Province: Karabük
- District: Karabük

Government
  - Mayor: Özkan Çetinkaya (AKP)
- Elevation: 301 m (988 ft)
- Population (2022): 125,403
- Time zone: UTC+3 (TRT)
- Postal code: 78000
- Area code: 0370
- Climate: Cfa
- Website: www.karabuk.bel.tr

Karabük is a city in the Black Sea region of Turkey. It is the seat of Karabük Province and Karabük District. Its population is 125,403 (2022). The town lies at an elevation of 301 m (988 ft).

Karabük was built in the 1930s as the seat of the iron and steel industry of Turkey, and thus is prone to the hazardous effects of air pollution. Karabük lies in a location near Filyos River formed by the merge of Araç and Soğanlı rivers.

== Name ==
There are no known records of the origin of its name; in Turkish kara means "black" and bük means "bush" or "blackberry bush" ("bramble"). So Karabük means "blackbush".

== History ==
Karabük is situated on an important trade route between Amasra on the coast and central Anatolia. The history of the city goes back to the early years of the Turkish Republic, when it was a small sub-village formed by 13 houses in the Öğlebeli village of Safranbolu. There was also a small train station on the Ankara–Zonguldak route. The town started to develop with the industrialization of the country. One of the first steel factories of the Republic was built here in 1939, after which it grew rapidly and incorporated Öğlebeli village as a quarter. Karabük became a municipality and then a township in the Safranbolu district in 1938. It became a district center in 1953 and a provincial center in 1995.

Hadrianapolis (now Eskipazar), is an ancient city from the Roman Empire of the 4th century, located about 30km (68km by road) from Karabük. There are many fountains, churches, and Roman baths. Although most of it is recently excavated, illegal excavations which have been going on for many years and have damaged Eskipazar's chances of becoming a major tourist attraction.

Also Safranbolu Aşağıgüney (Kellecoğun) village has Hellenistic Era sculptures.This village has Roman Era caves and structures.

== Climate ==
Karabük has a humid subtropical climate (Köppen: Cfa) or a relatively warm oceanic climate (Trewartha: Do) with hot, humid summers and chilly, wet winters.

Climate data for Karabük (1991–2020, extremes 1965–2023)
Month	Jan	Feb	Mar	Apr	May	Jun	Jul	Aug	Sep	Oct	Nov	Dec	Year
Record high °C (°F)	20.1 (68.2)	23.5 (74.3)	29.7 (85.5)	32.4 (90.3)	37.0 (98.6)	37.6 (99.7)	41.4 (106.5)	43.7 (110.7)	40.9 (105.6)	33.3 (91.9)	26.9 (80.4)	21.4 (70.5)	43.7 (110.7)
Mean daily maximum °C (°F)	7.9 (46.2)	11.6 (52.9)	14.8 (58.6)	20.2 (68.4)	24.4 (75.9)	27.8 (82.0)	31.3 (88.3)	32.7 (90.9)	28.4 (83.1)	21.7 (71.1)	15.3 (59.5)	9.5 (49.1)	20.5 (68.8)
Daily mean °C (°F)	2.8 (37.0)	5.4 (41.7)	7.8 (46.0)	12.1 (53.8)	16.6 (61.9)	20.2 (68.4)	23.1 (73.6)	24.0 (75.2)	19.7 (67.5)	14.3 (57.7)	8.6 (47.5)	4.5 (40.1)	13.3 (55.9)
Mean daily minimum °C (°F)	−0.5 (31.1)	1.2 (34.2)	2.8 (37.0)	5.8 (42.4)	10.6 (51.1)	14.5 (58.1)	16.1 (61.0)	16.9 (62.4)	13.2 (55.8)	9.2 (48.6)	4.4 (39.9)	2.7 (36.9)	8.1 (46.5)
Record low °C (°F)	−11.5 (11.3)	−11.8 (10.8)	−7.5 (18.5)	−2.1 (28.2)	0.5 (32.9)	0.7 (33.3)	10.4 (50.7)	10.8 (51.4)	4.5 (40.1)	0.1 (32.2)	−5.4 (22.3)	−10.9 (12.4)	−11.8 (10.8)
Average precipitation mm (inches)	47.9 (1.89)	37.7 (1.48)	45.0 (1.77)	45.4 (1.79)	56.6 (2.23)	81.9 (3.22)	31.8 (1.25)	30.7 (1.21)	27.0 (1.06)	44.0 (1.73)	43.7 (1.72)	57.0 (2.24)	548.7 (21.59)
Average precipitation days	13.1	11.3	12.8	12.5	13.4	13.7	5.3	4.7	6.7	9.4	9.8	12.8	125.5
Mean monthly sunshine hours	74.4	101.7	120.9	192.0	210.8	219.0	300.7	269.7	219.0	164.3	132.0	83.7	2,088.2
Mean daily sunshine hours	2.4	3.6	3.9	6.4	6.8	7.3	9.7	8.7	7.3	5.3	4.4	2.7	5.7
Source: Turkish State Meteorological Service

== Economy ==
Karabük has its own resources of dolomite and limestone, while coal and manganese is brought from Zonguldak and iron ore from Divriği. This allows a varied, yet basic industry in Karabük, including a coking plant, blast furnaces, a foundry and tube works. There are also chemical plants that produce sulfuric acid and phosphates. Nearby are the Zonguldak coal fields.

One of the major steel producers in Turkey, namely Kardemir (Karabük Iron and Steel Works), is located in Karabük.

== Gallery ==
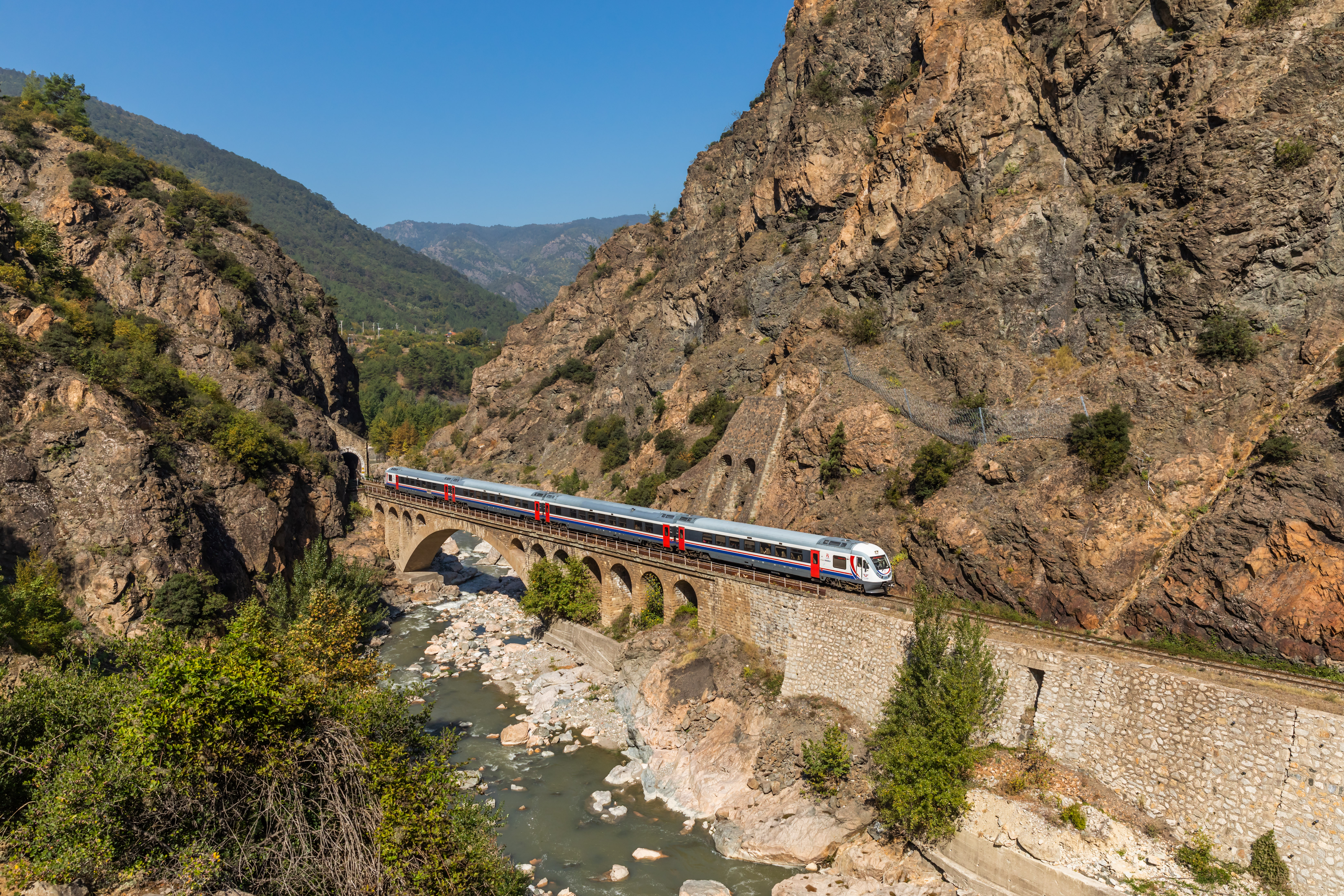
The TCDD MT15441 in Bolkuş, Karabük.

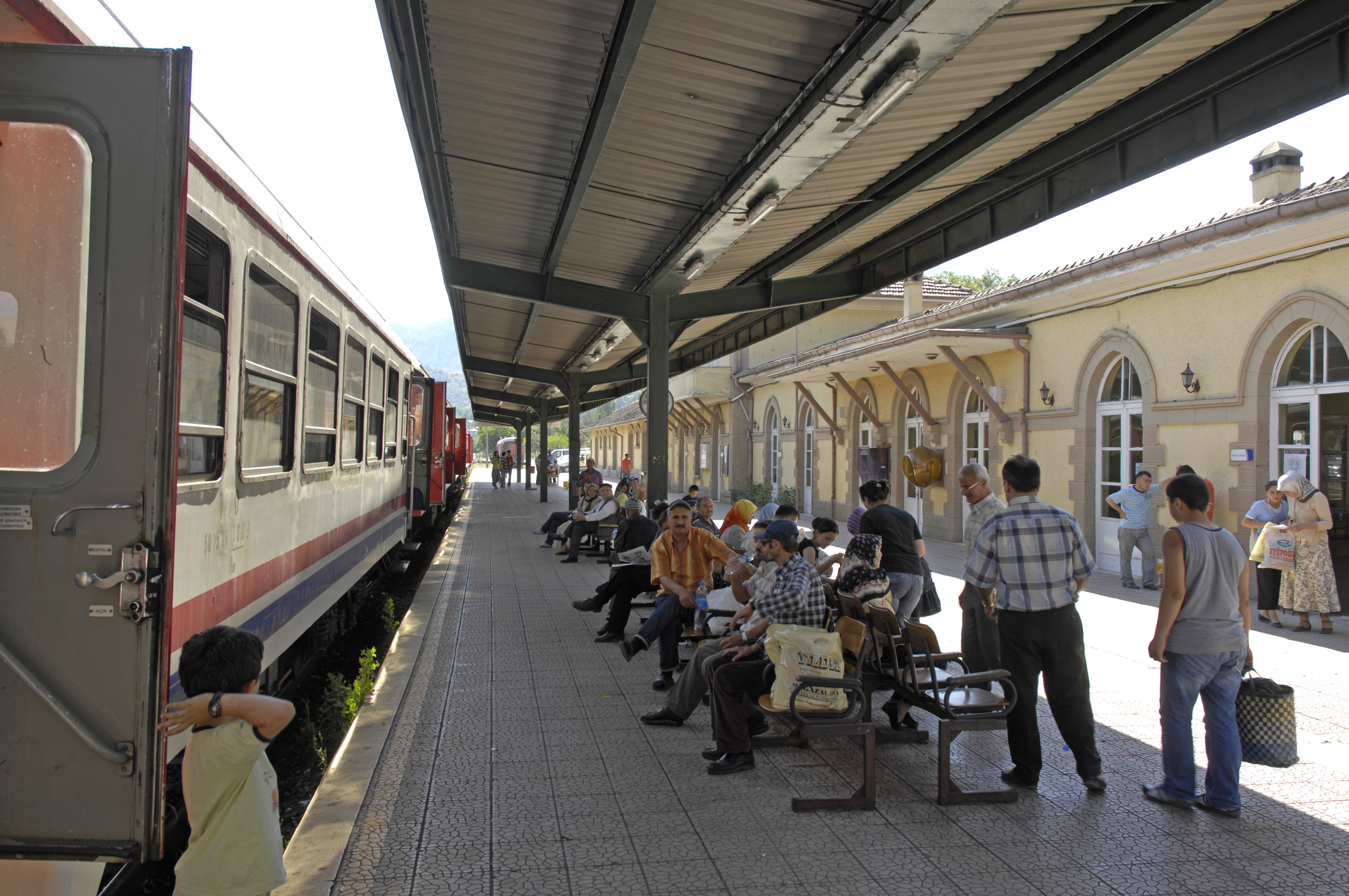
Karabük station

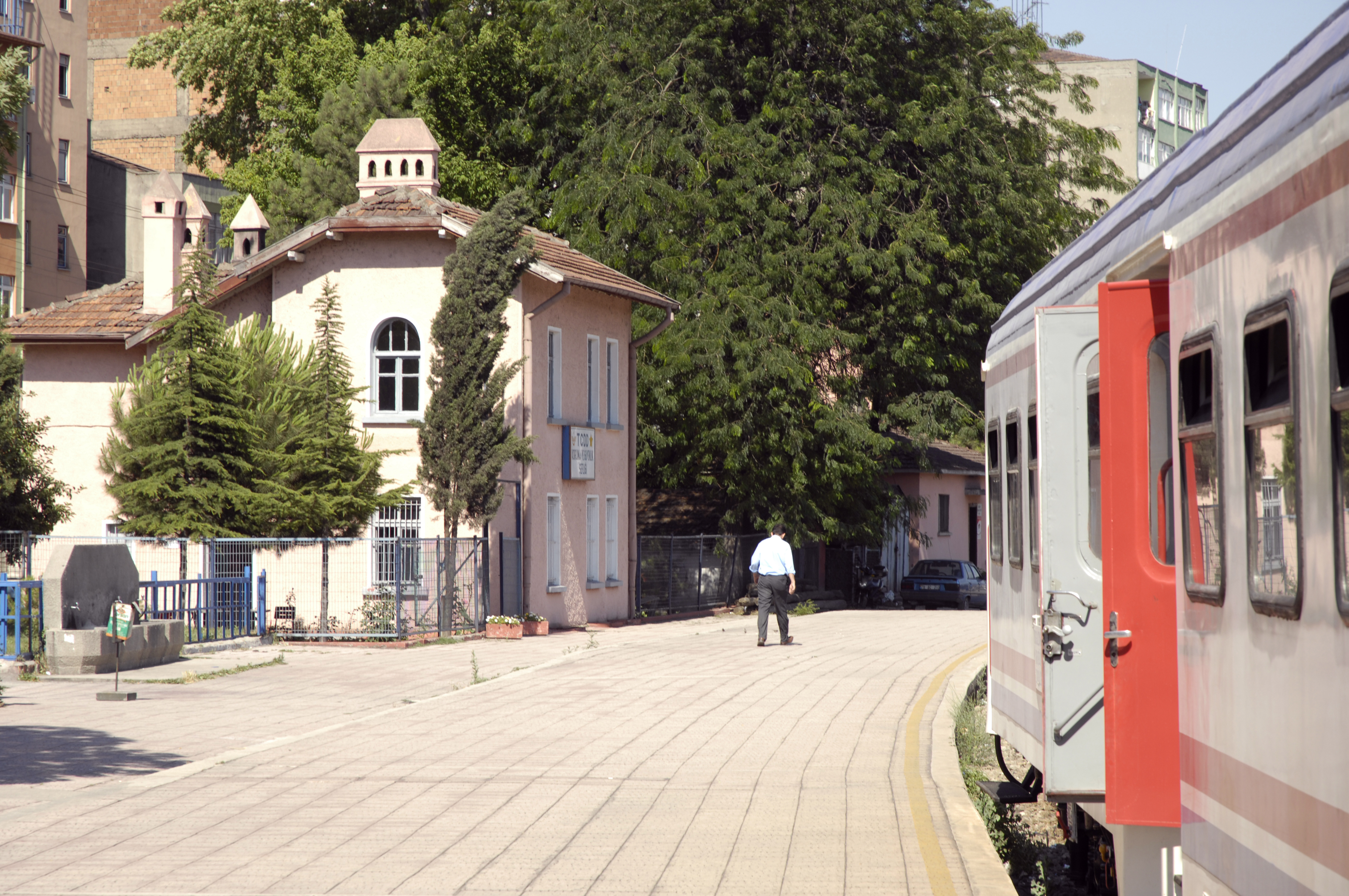
Karabük station

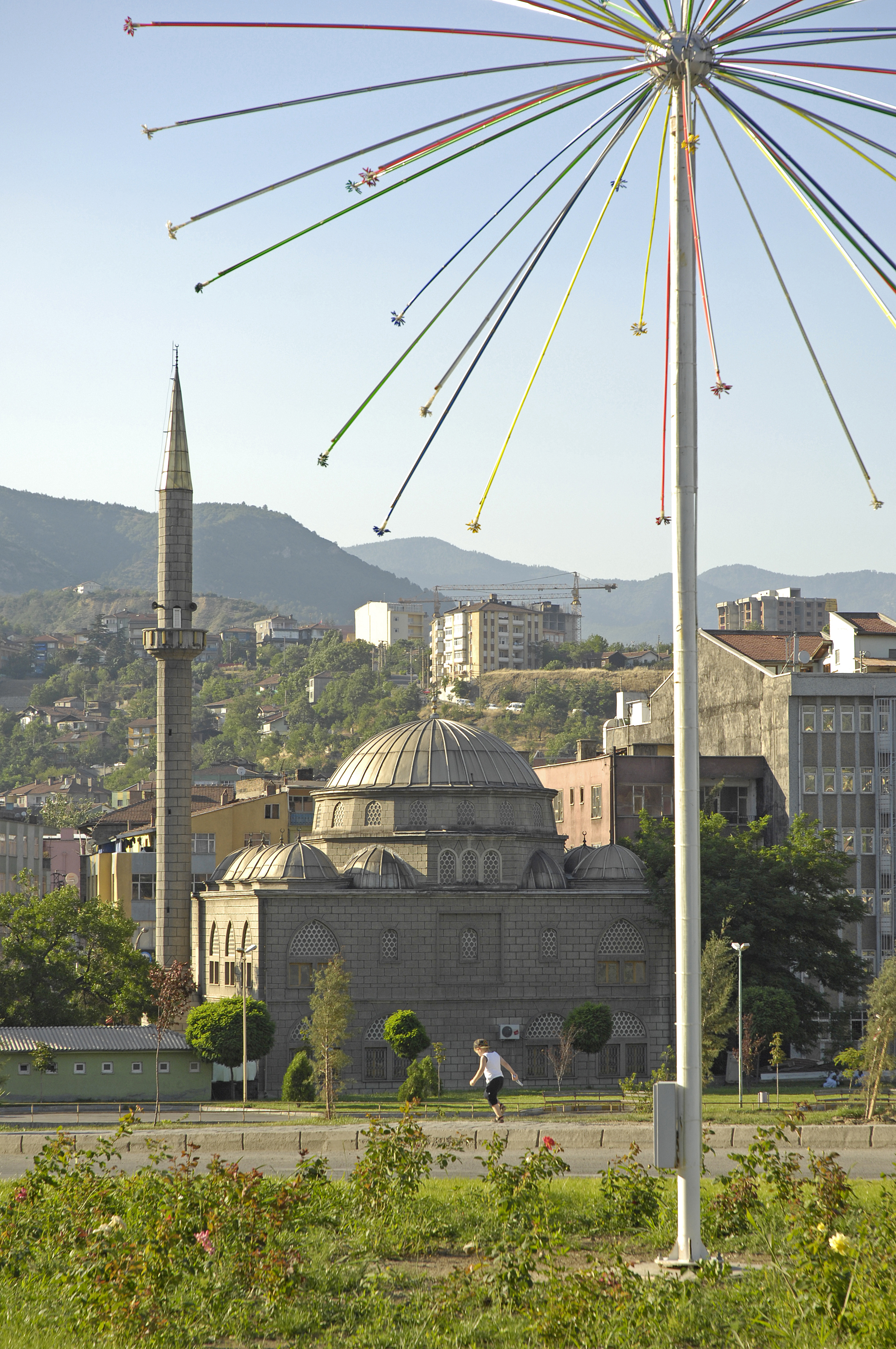
Karabük general view

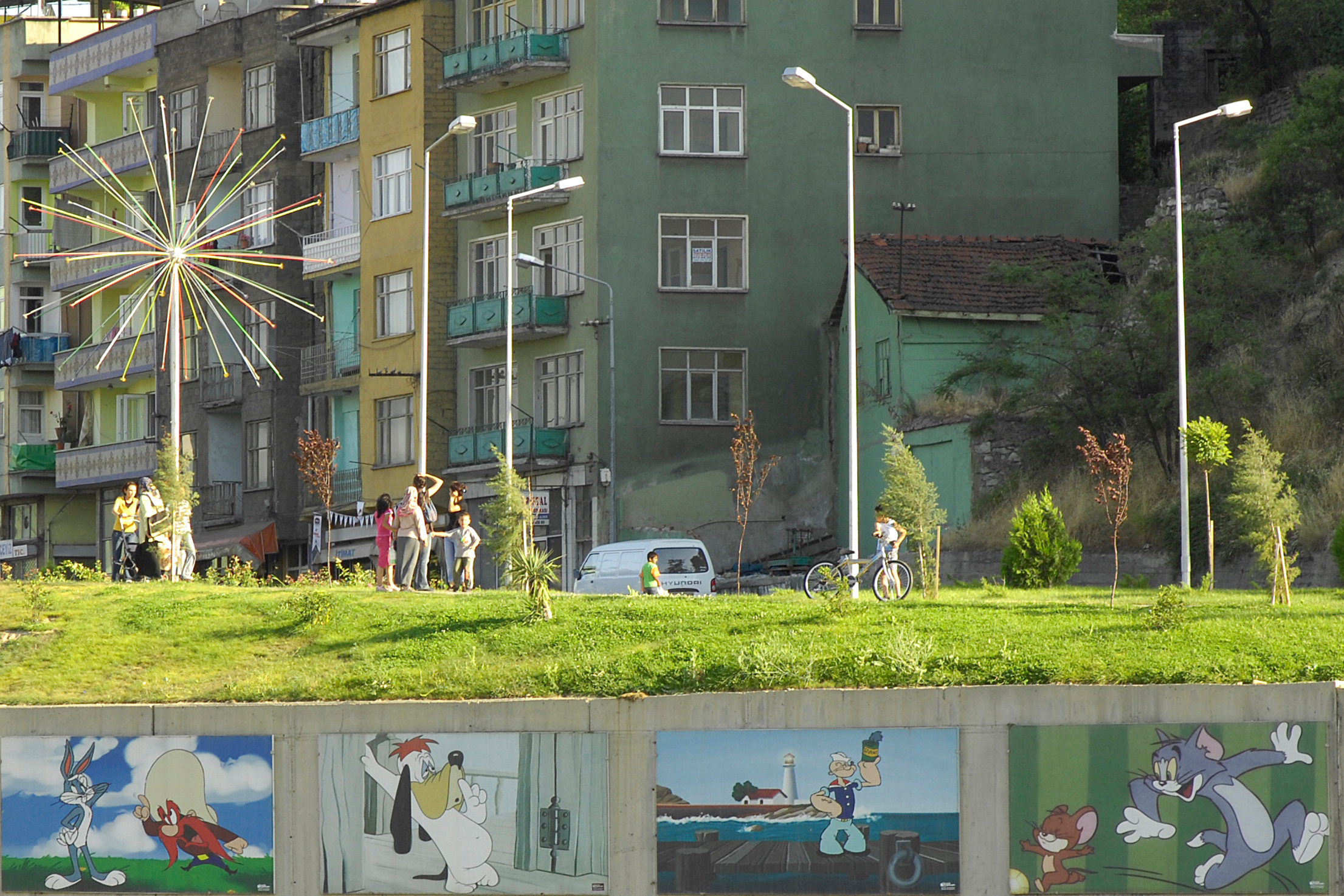
Karabük general view

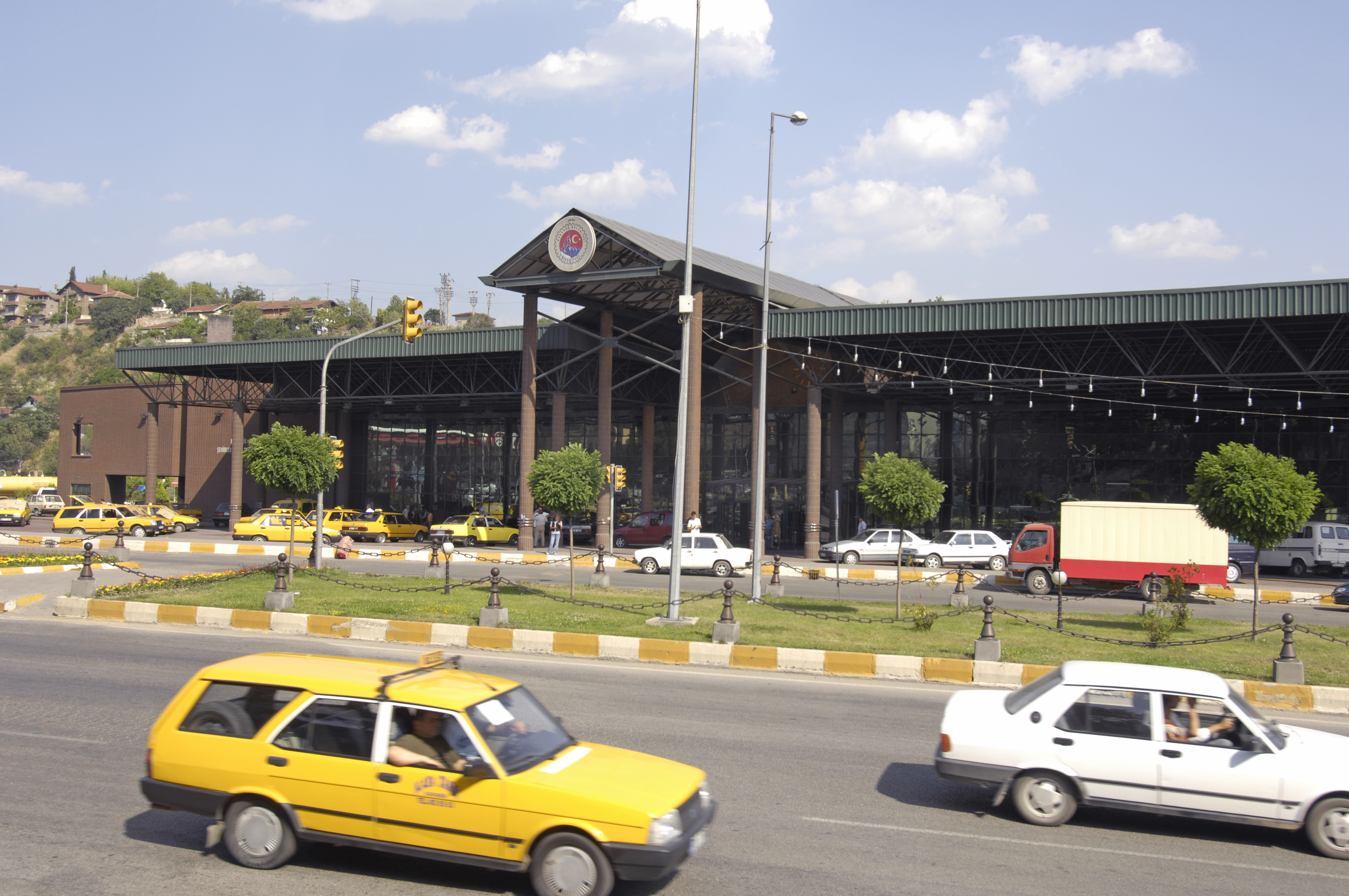
Karabük otogar

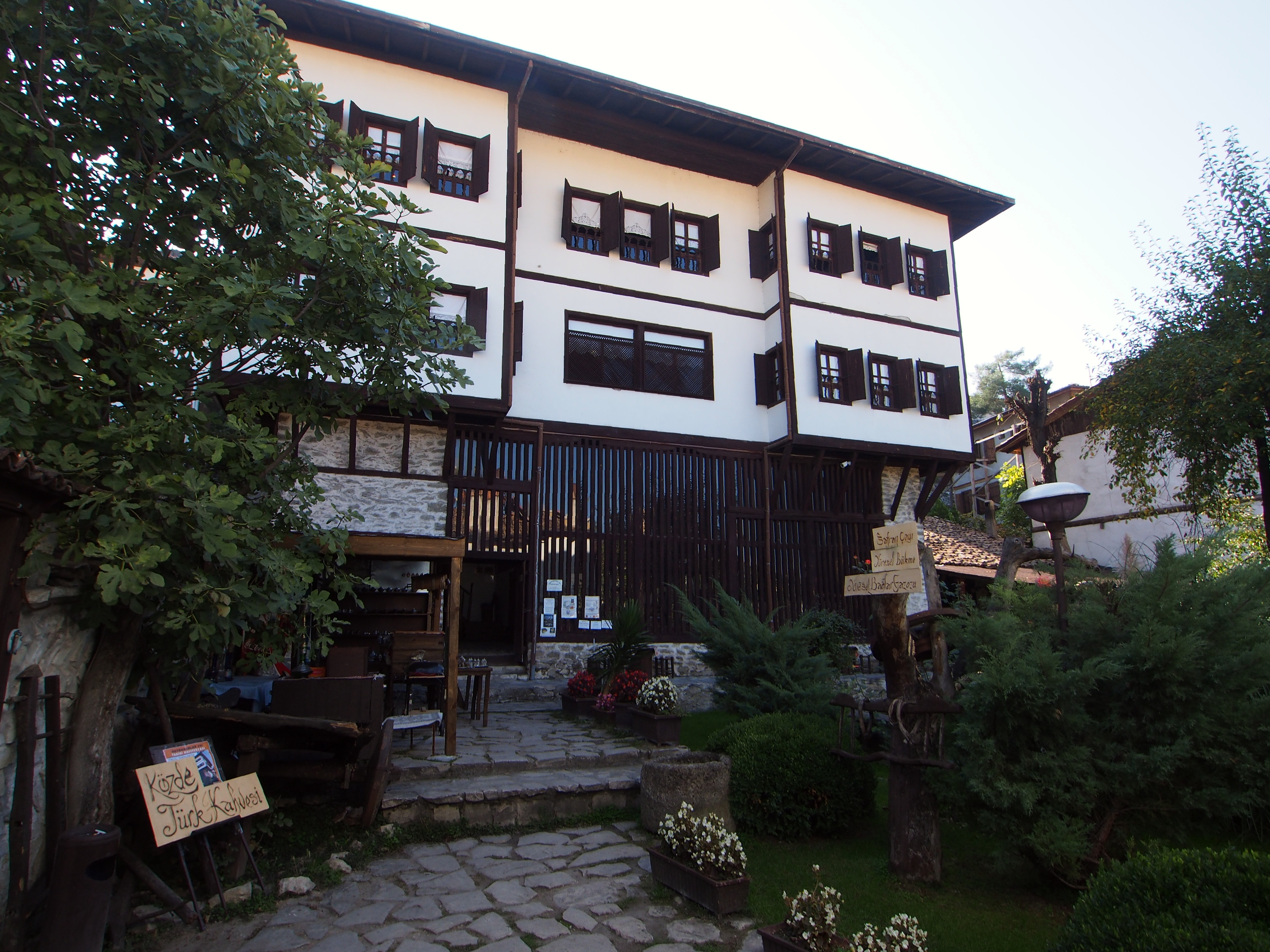
Kaymakamlar Museum

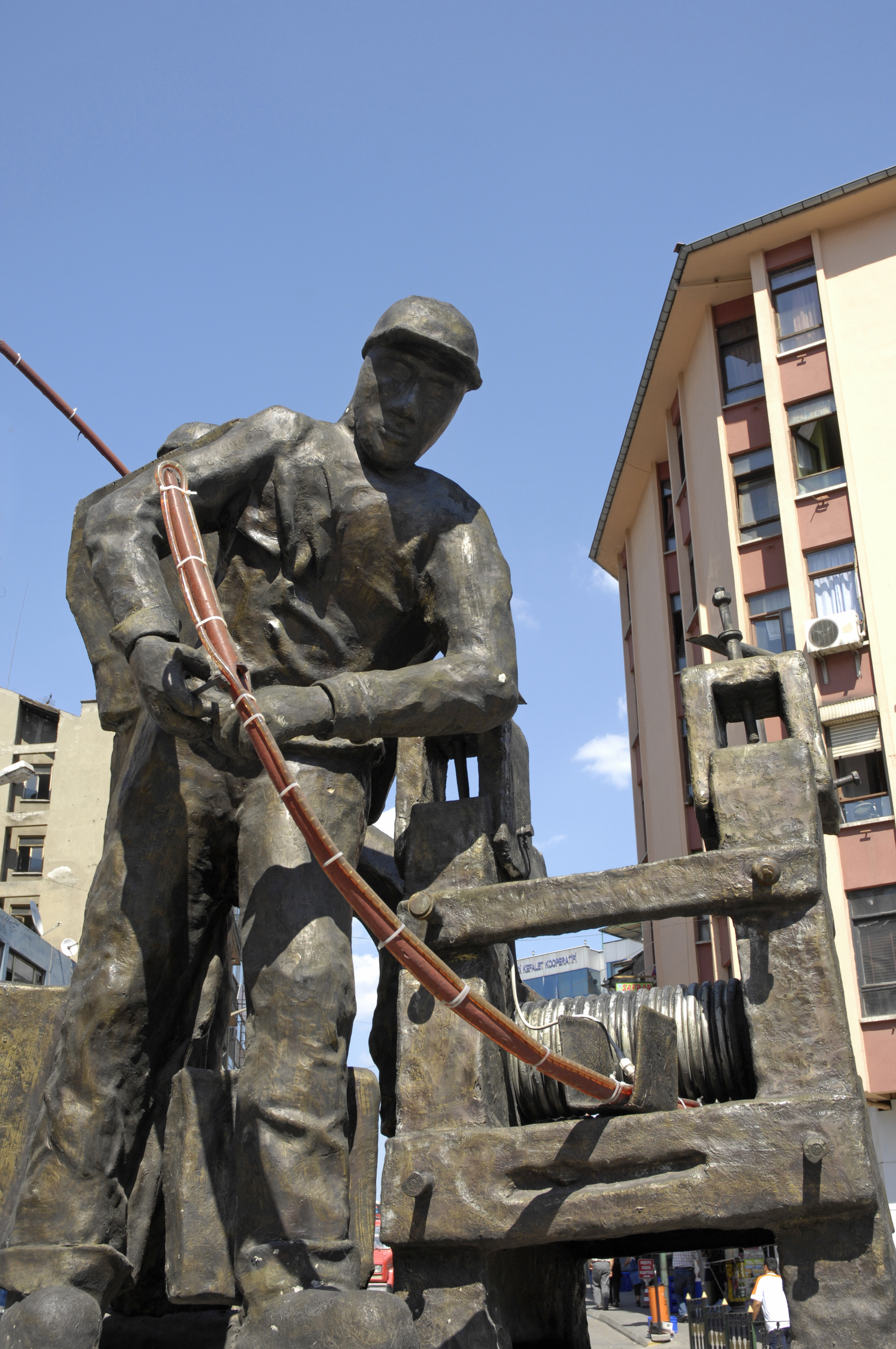
Karabük labourers monument

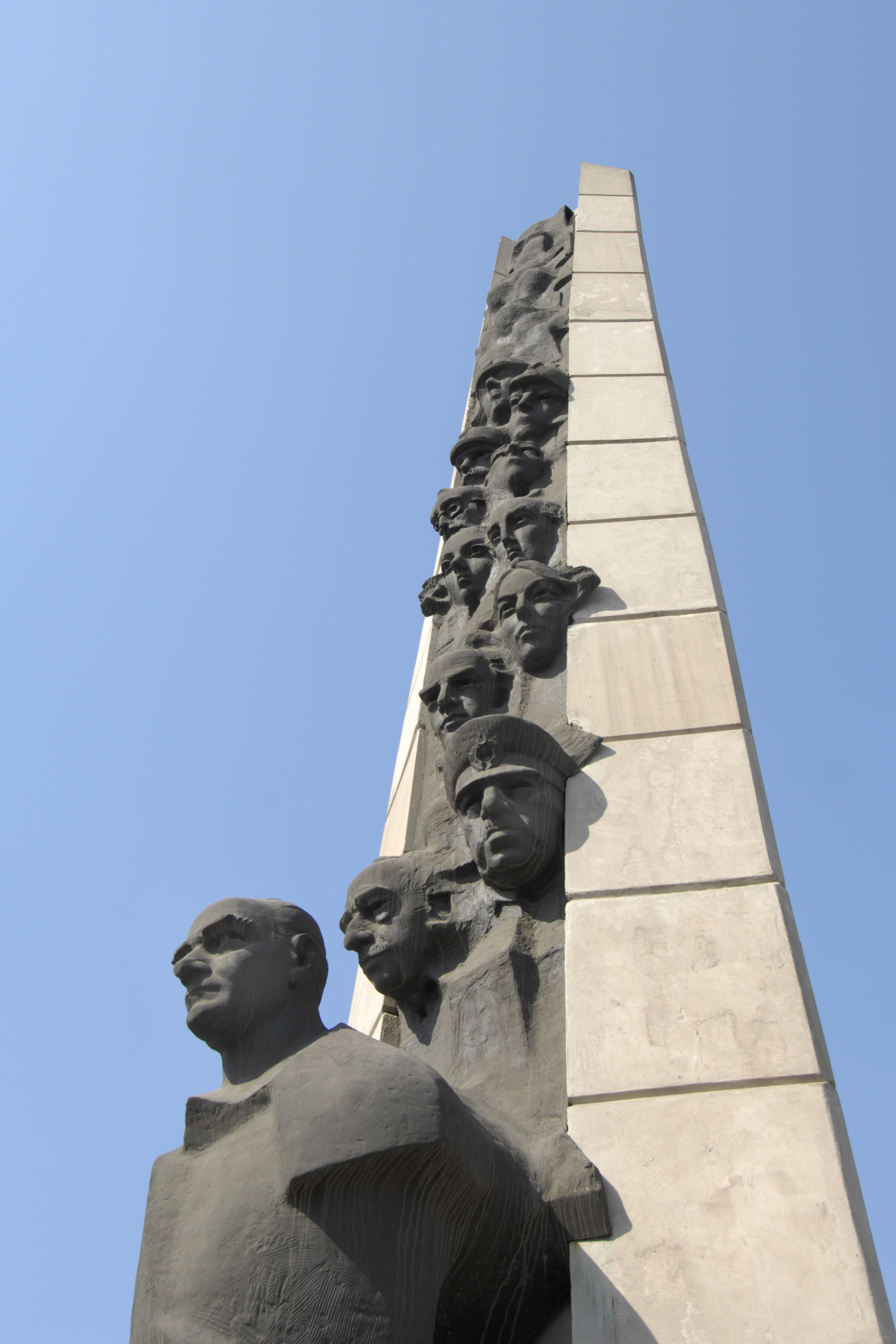
Karabük Atatürk monument

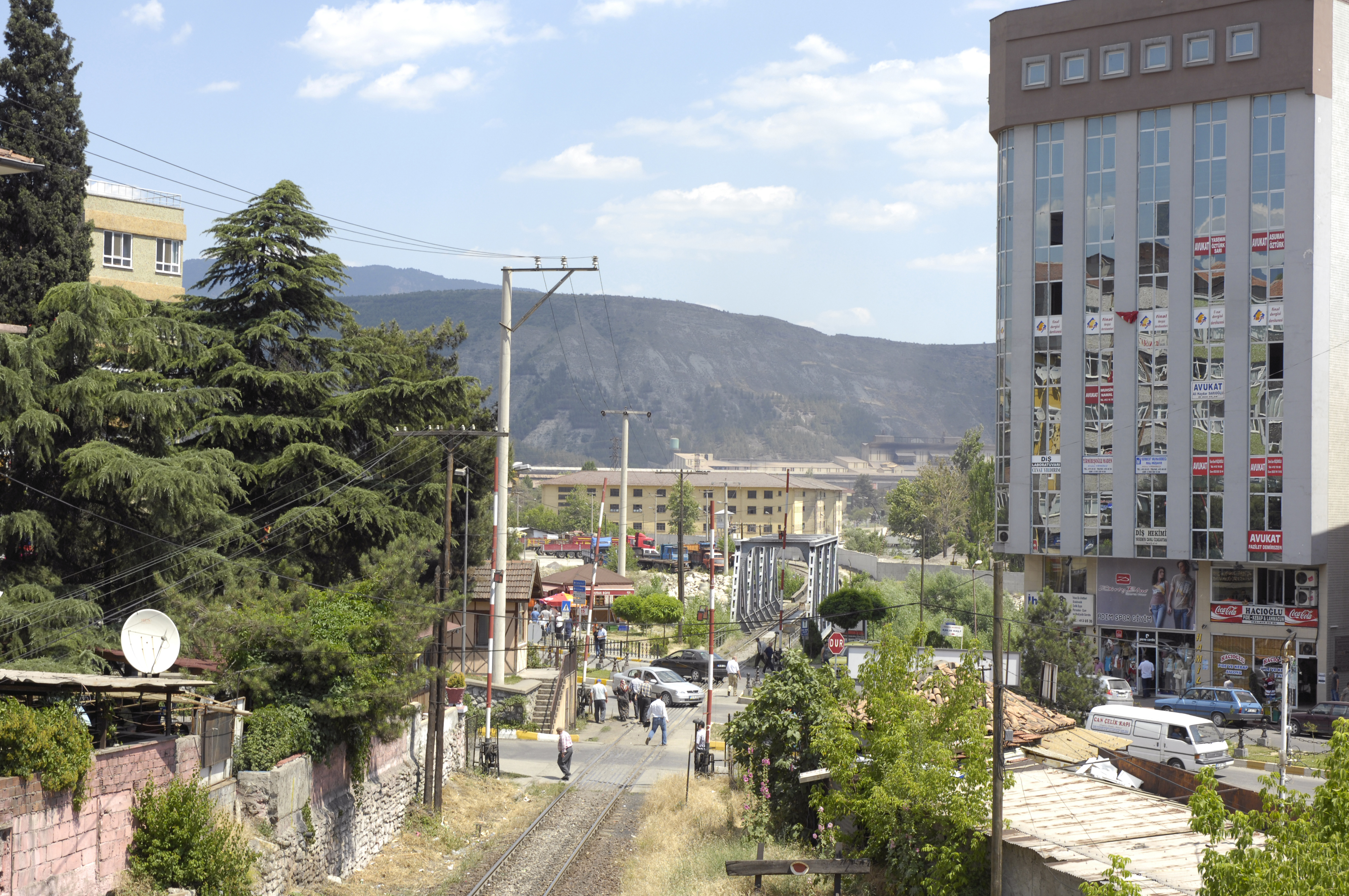
Karabük at railroad

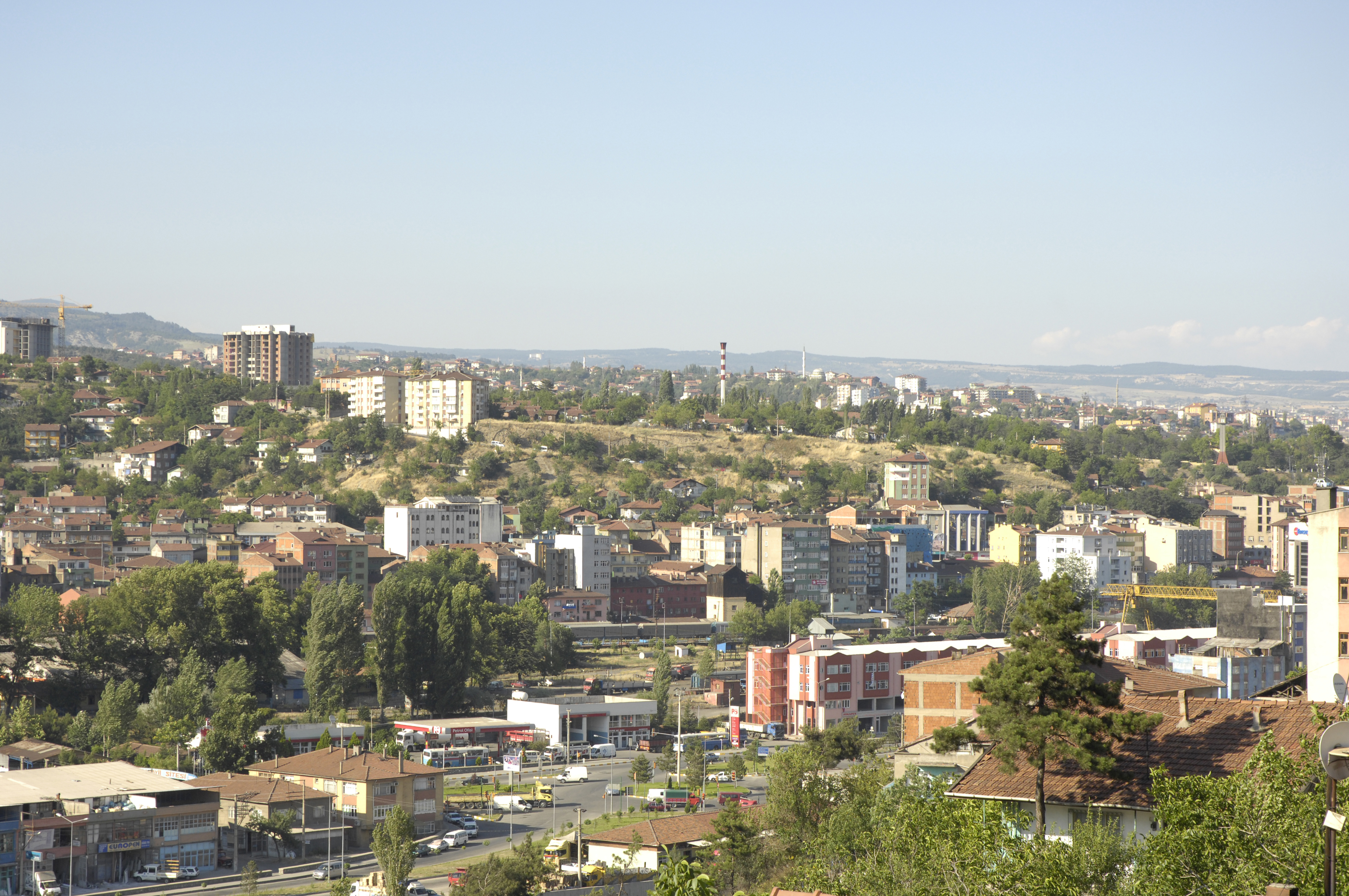
Karabük view
