= Karabük Province =

Coordinates: 41°13′25″N 32°38′25″E

Karabük Province Karabük ili
- Province
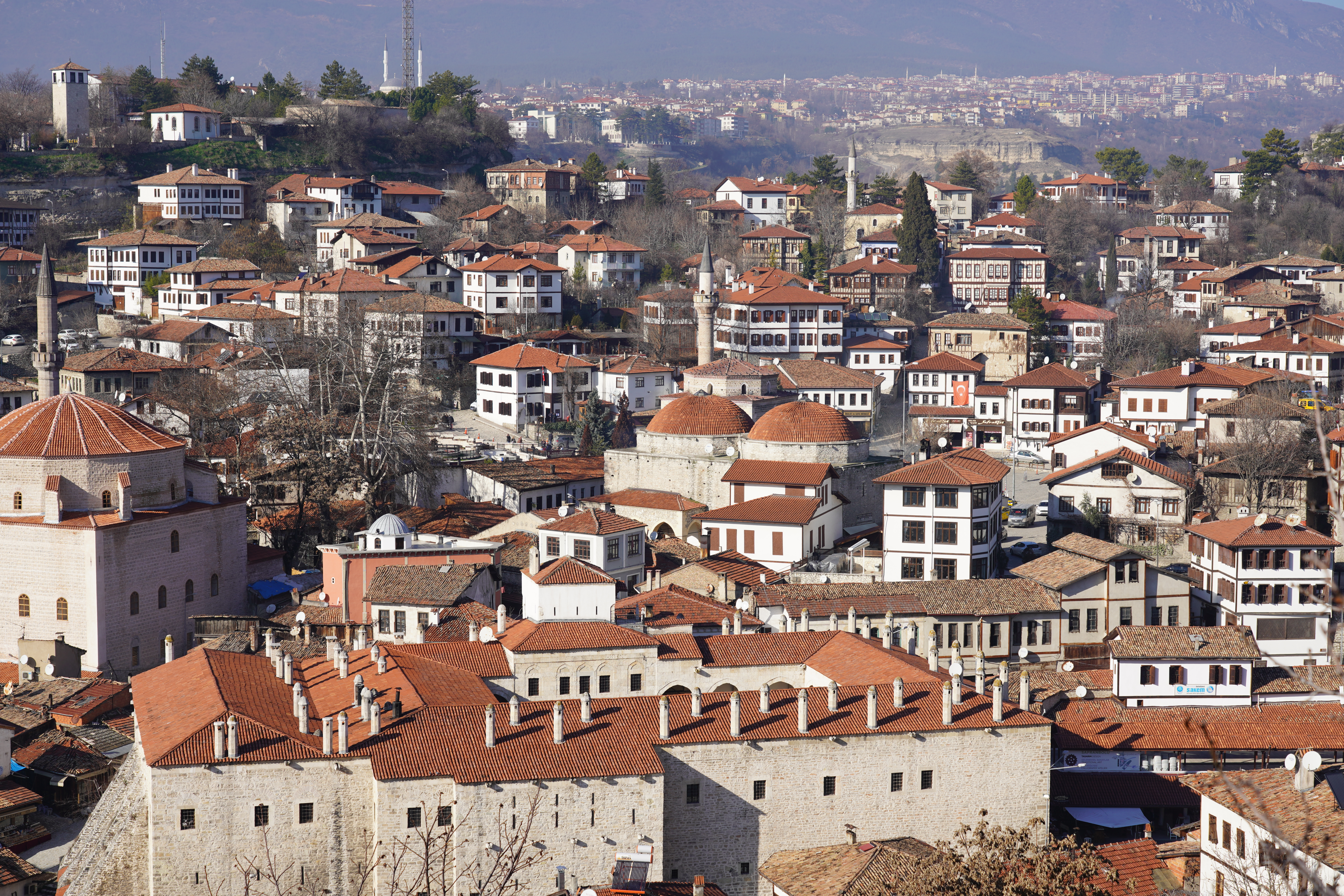
- Safranbolu

- Location of the province within Turkey
- Country: Turkey
- Seat: Karabük

Government
  - Governor: Oktay Çağatay
- Area: 4,142 km^{2} (1,599 sq mi)
- Population (2022): 252,058
  - Density: 60.85/km^{2} (157.6/sq mi)
- Time zone: UTC+3 (TRT)
- Area code: 0370
- Website: www.karabuk.gov.tr

Karabük Province (Turkish: Karabük ili) is a landlocked province in the northern part of Anatolia (northern central Turkey), located about 200 km (124 mi) north of Ankara, 115 km (71 mi) away from Zonguldak and 113 km (70 mi) away from Kastamonu. Its area is 4,142 km^{2}, and its population is 252,058 (2022). The main city is Karabük which is located about 100 km (62 mi) south of the Black Sea coast.

== Overview ==
Karabük Province is one of the newest provinces of Turkey. Established in 1995, it comprises Karabük, Eflani, Safranbolu and Yenice districts which were formerly part of Zonguldak Province and Eskipazar and Ovacık districts which were previously part of Çankırı Province.

Karabük is located on the highway between Bartın and Ankara, which was in ancient times an important route between Amasra on the coast and central Anatolia. The railway between Ankara and Zonguldak passes through Karabük.

Safranbolu, a historically important city, which is listed in the UNESCO World Heritage List, is located in Karabük Province.

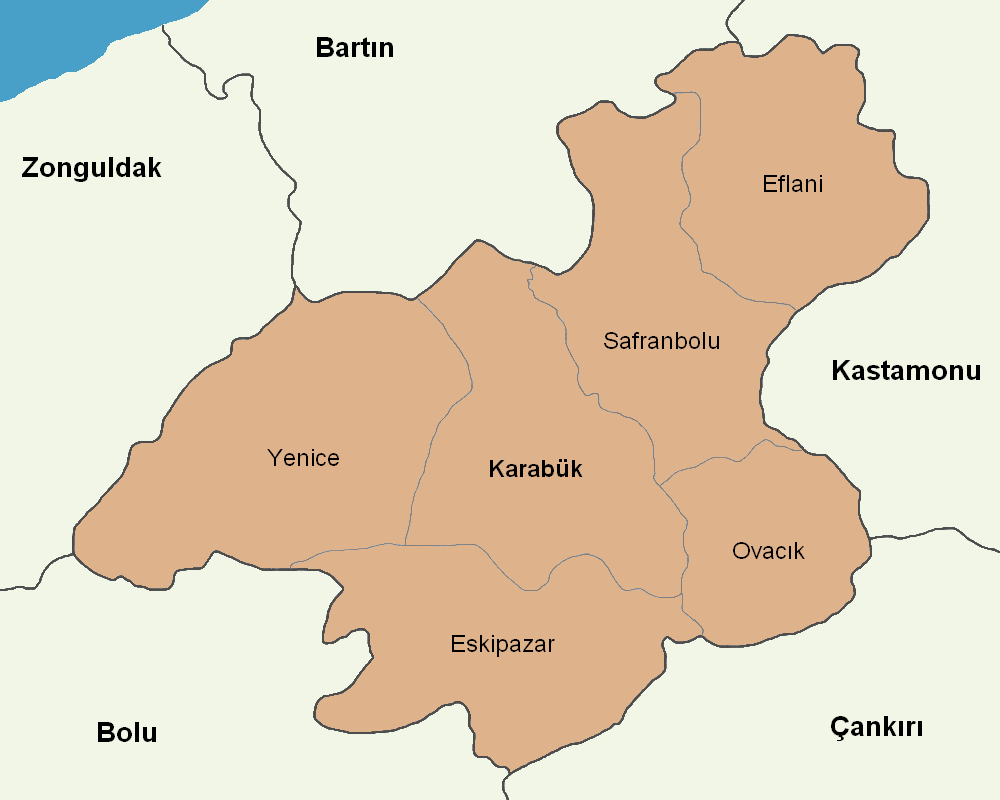

== Districts ==
Karabük province is divided into 6 districts (capital district in bold):

- Eflani
- Eskipazar
- **Karabük**
- Ovacık
- Safranbolu
- Yenice

== History ==
Archaeological surface surveys carried out around Eskipazar and Ovacık suggest that human settlement in the Karabük region began as early as the Early Bronze Age. Specifically, the village of Yazıboy in Eskipazar is identified as the oldest known settlement site within the province. A tumulus there has been dated to approximately 2500 BC; placing it firmly in the Early Bronze Age period.

Karabük’s location along the ancient trade route between Amasra on the Black Sea coast and Central Anatolia has long shaped its significance. However, modern Karabük itself emerged only in the early Turkish Republic era. Initially, it was a small settlement of around 13 houses in the village of Öğlebeli, part of Safranbolu district, adjacent to a station on the Ankara–Zonguldak railway line. Following the establishment of the Karabük Iron and Steel Factory in 1939, the settlement grew rapidly, earning municipality status in 1941, district status in 1953, and eventually becoming the capital of the newly created Karabük Province in 1995.

== Gallery ==
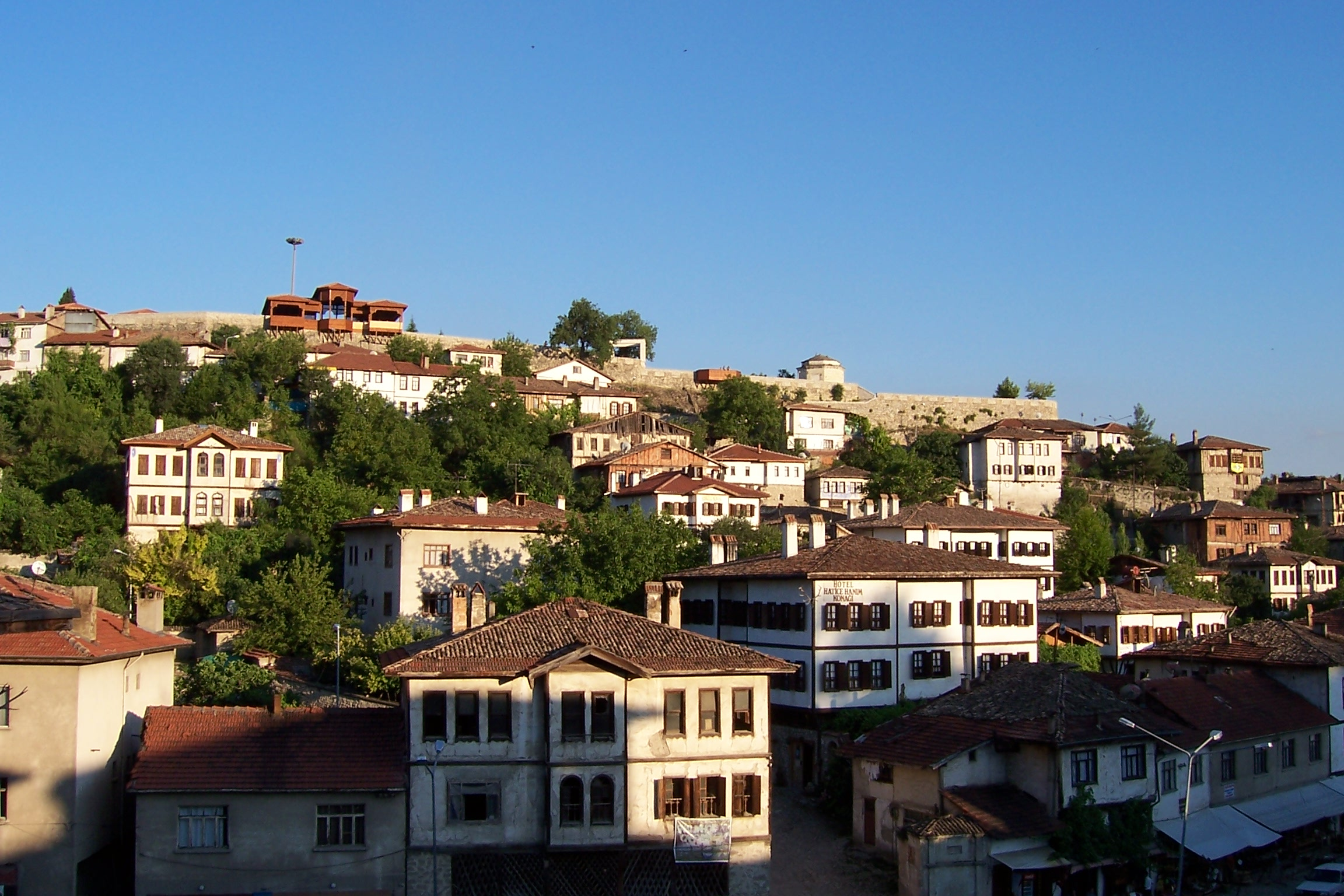
Traditional houses of Safranbolu

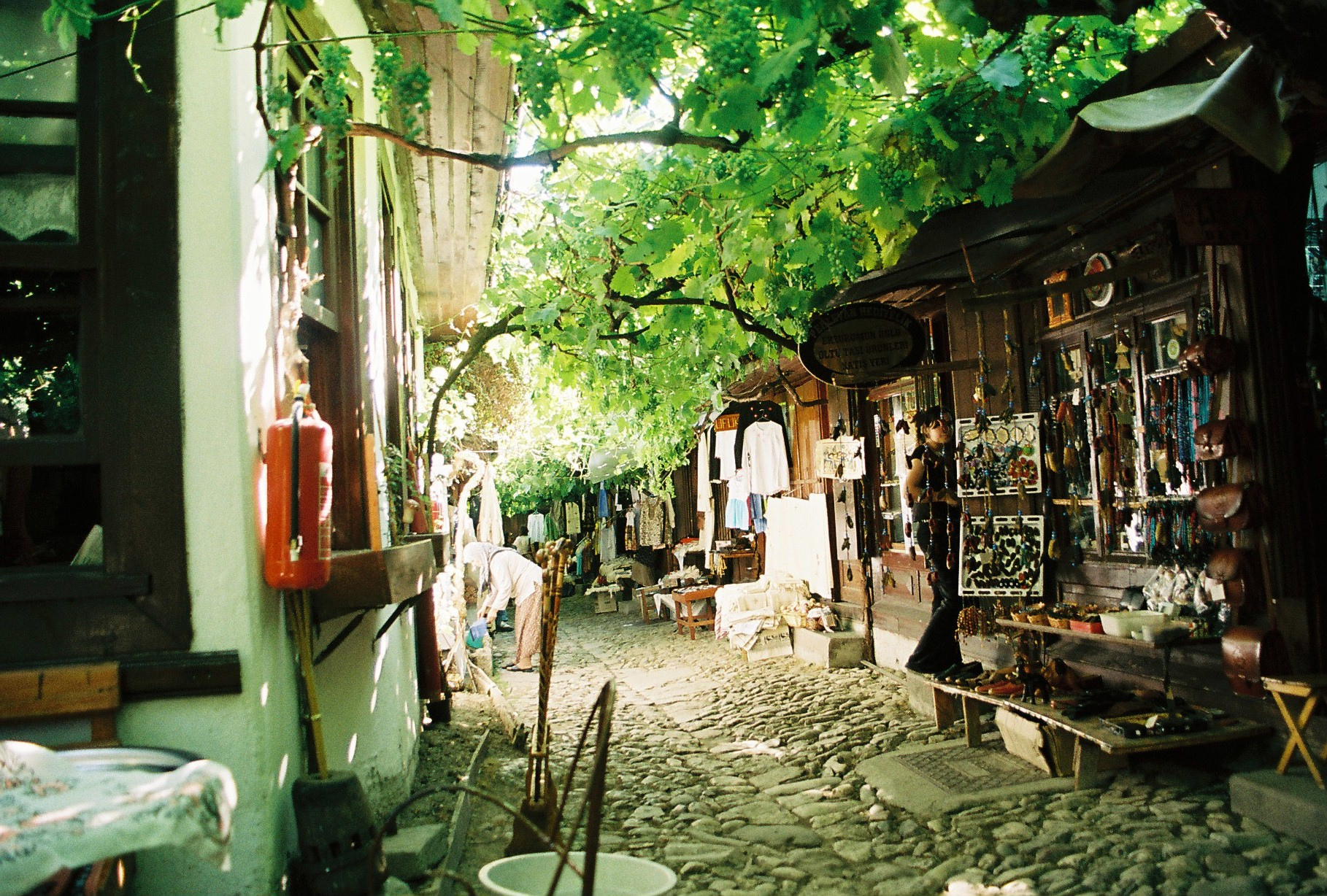
Historical shoe-maker shops in Safranbolu

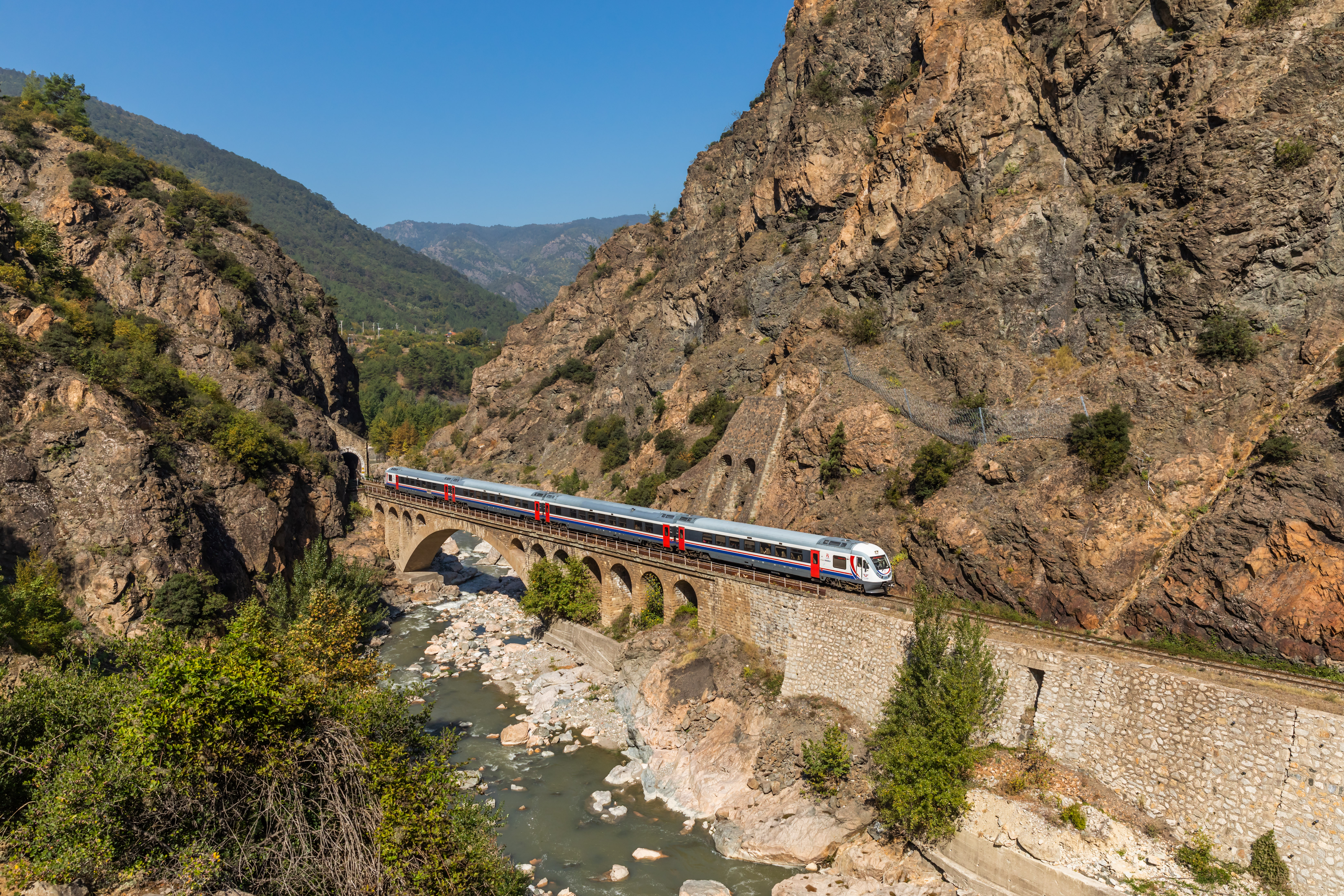
Zonguldak - Karabük service crossing the Filyos river near the Bolkuş village in Karabük Province.

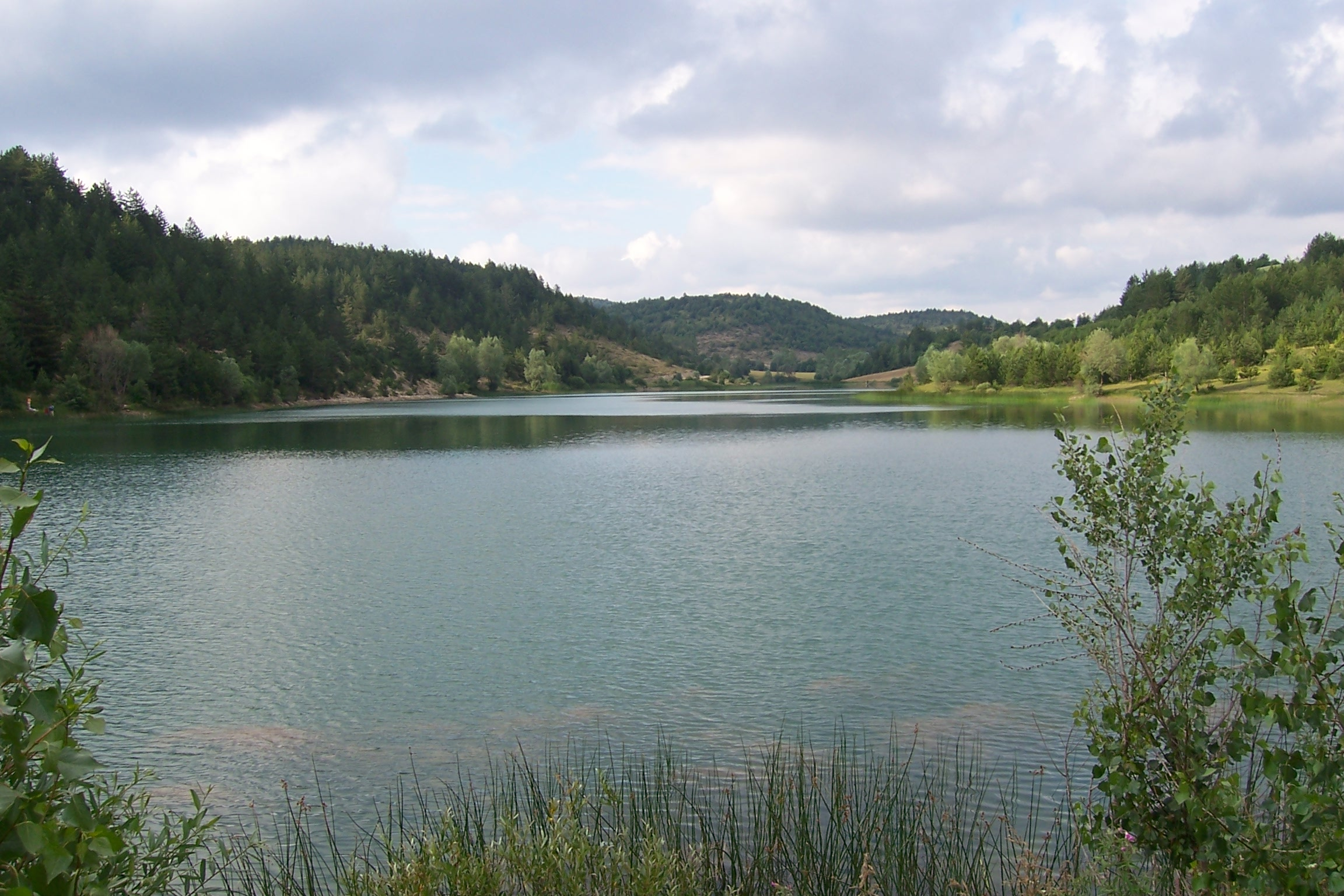
Bostancı Pond in Eflani

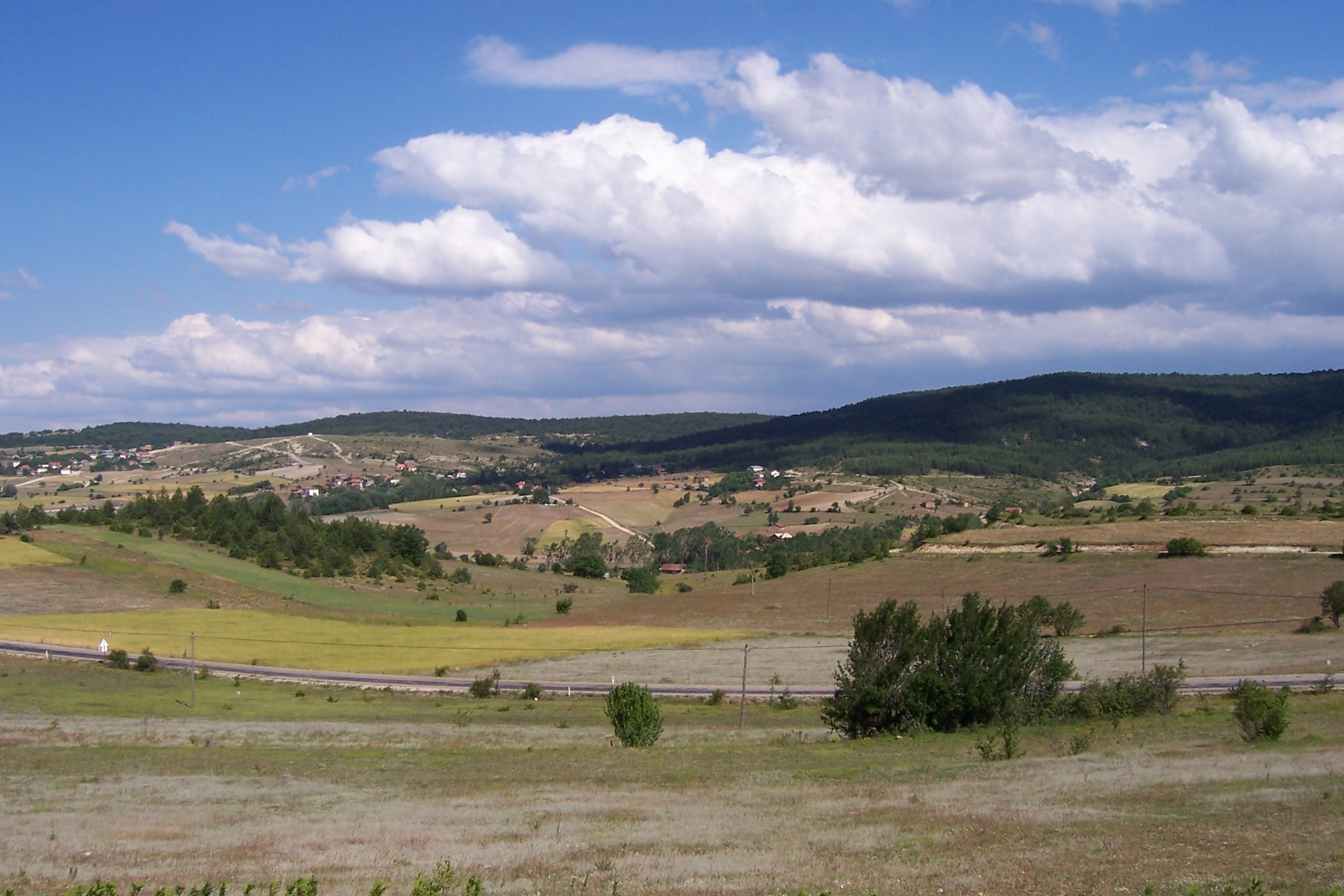
Eflani countryside

== See also ==
- List of populated places in Karabük Province
