= Kazdağlı Mosque =

Mosque in Safranbolu, Turkey

- Kazdağlı Camii
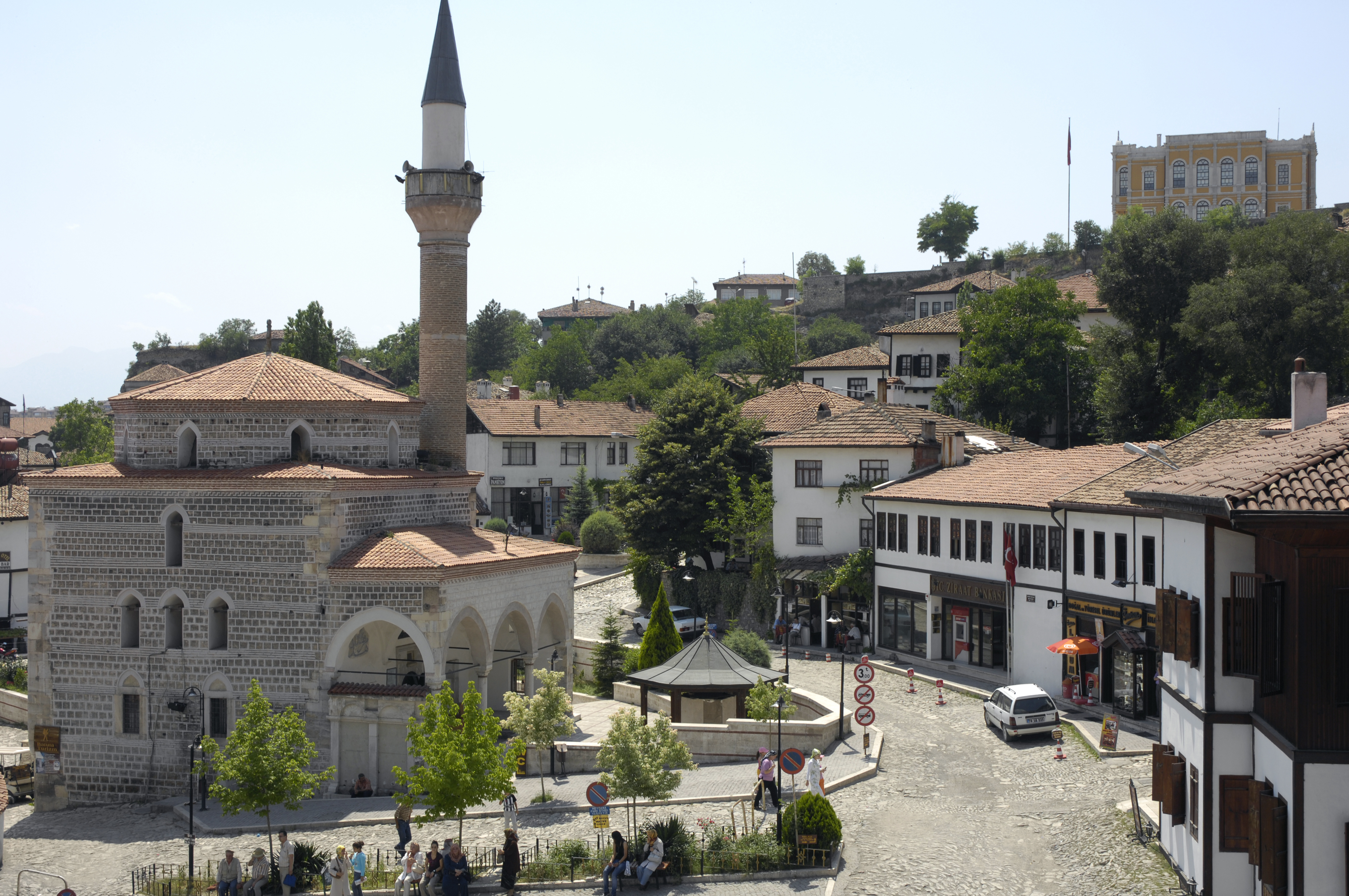

- Location within Turkey

Religion
- Affiliation: Islam

Location
- Municipality: Safranbolu
- Country: Turkey
- Interactive map of Kazdağlı Mosque
- Coordinates: 41.245536°N 32.692773°E

Architecture
- Architect: Kazdağlı Mehmet Agha
- Type: mosque
- Style: Ottoman
- Completed: 1779
- Minaret: 1

The Kazdağlı Mosque (Turkish: Kazdağlı Camii) is a historical mosque located in Safranbolu, Turkey.

== Architecture ==
It was constructed on the site of an old mosque in 1779 by Kazdağlı Mehmet Agha in the entrance of the bazaar of Safranbolu. The square planned mosque is constructed from stone and brick, and its upper side is covered with a squinched brick dome. A three part last congregation place is situated in the front part of the mosque. The middle part of the congregation place is covered with the dome, and other parts are covered with a cavetto vault. The dome and vaults are covered with bricks. The mihrab and minbar of the mosque are of plain design. The minaret, which is situated to the right of the entrance, is made of brick and has one balcony. There is no information about the old mosque. In 2004, the ownership of the mosque passed to Head Office of Foundation from the Municipality, and it was restored in the same year.

== See also ==
- List of mosques
- Ottoman architecture
