= Corciano Altarpiece =

1513 painting by Perugino

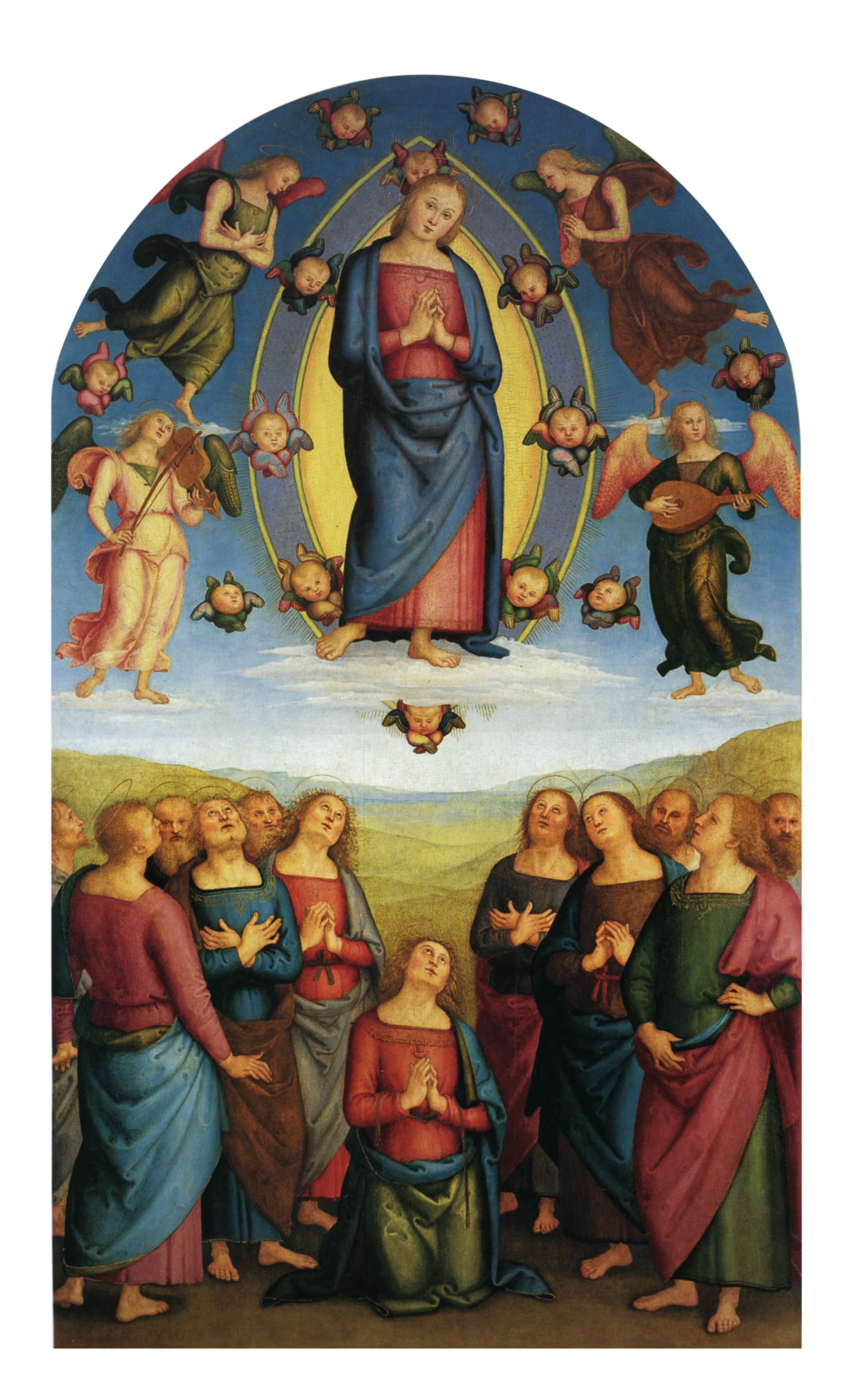
- Artist: Perugino
- Year: 1513
- Medium: oil on panel
- Dimensions: 226 cm × 149 cm (89 in × 59 in)
- Location: Parish church of Santa Maria, Corciano

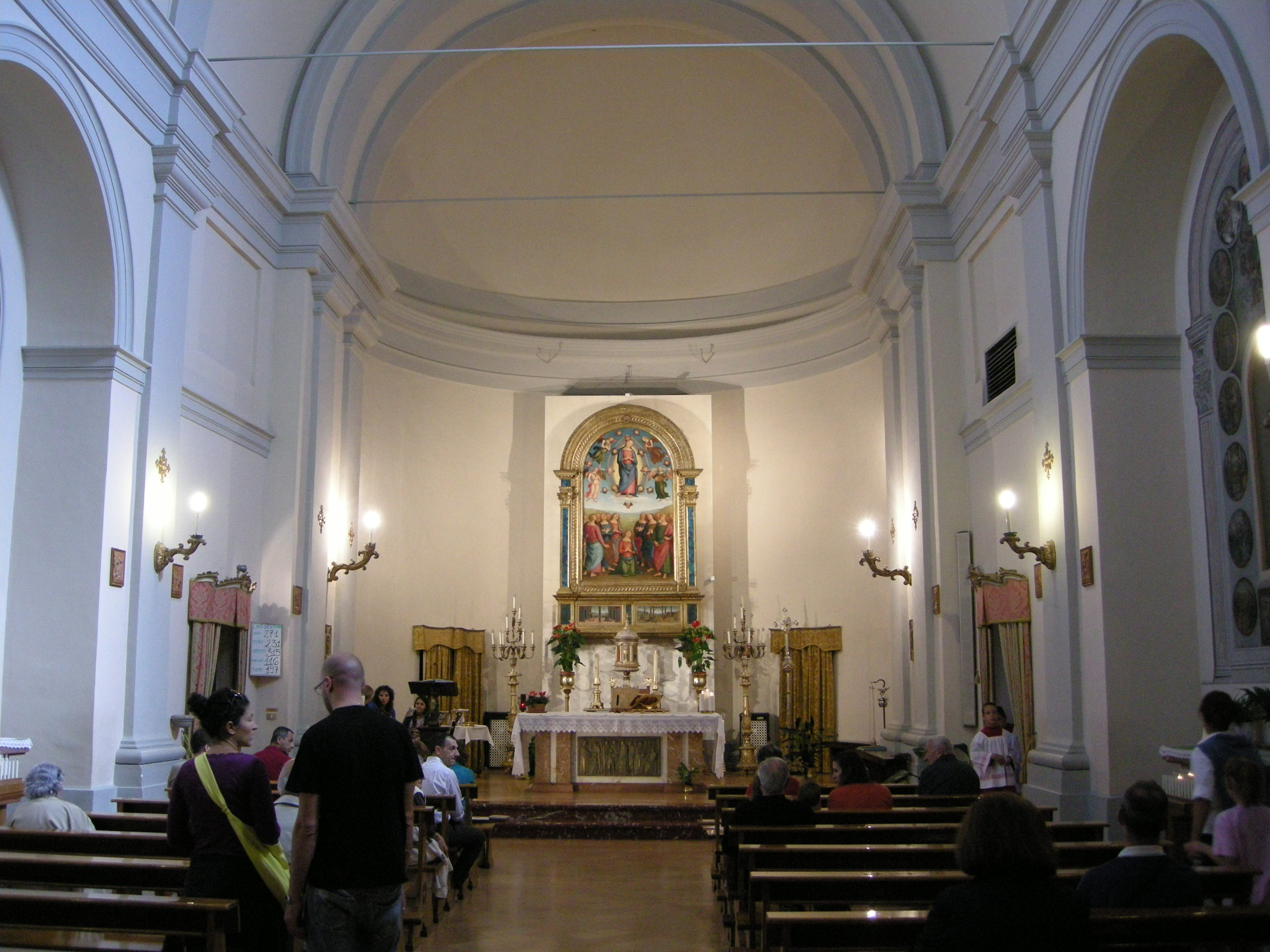
The altarpiece in situ

The Corciano Altarpiece is a 1513 painting by Perugino now in the parish church of Santa Maria in Corciano. It was produced following a past commission for Perugino to decorate the high altar of the parish church in Corciano.

It shows the Assumption of Mary, with Mary herself in a contrapposto pose inside a double mandorla, surrounded symmetrically by seraphim, with two angels praying and two playing musical instruments. On the lower register are the twelve apostles, with only St. Thomas St. Thomas] kneeling. In the background are a clear sky and gilded treeless hills, forming a valley.

Perugino largely used and adapted his existing drawings for the work, reusing angels from the scene of the Baptism of Christ in the Sant'Agostino Altarpiece and arranging the apostles as in the Annunziata Polyptych. The work also has a two-panel predella showing The Annunciation and The Adoration of the Christ Child.

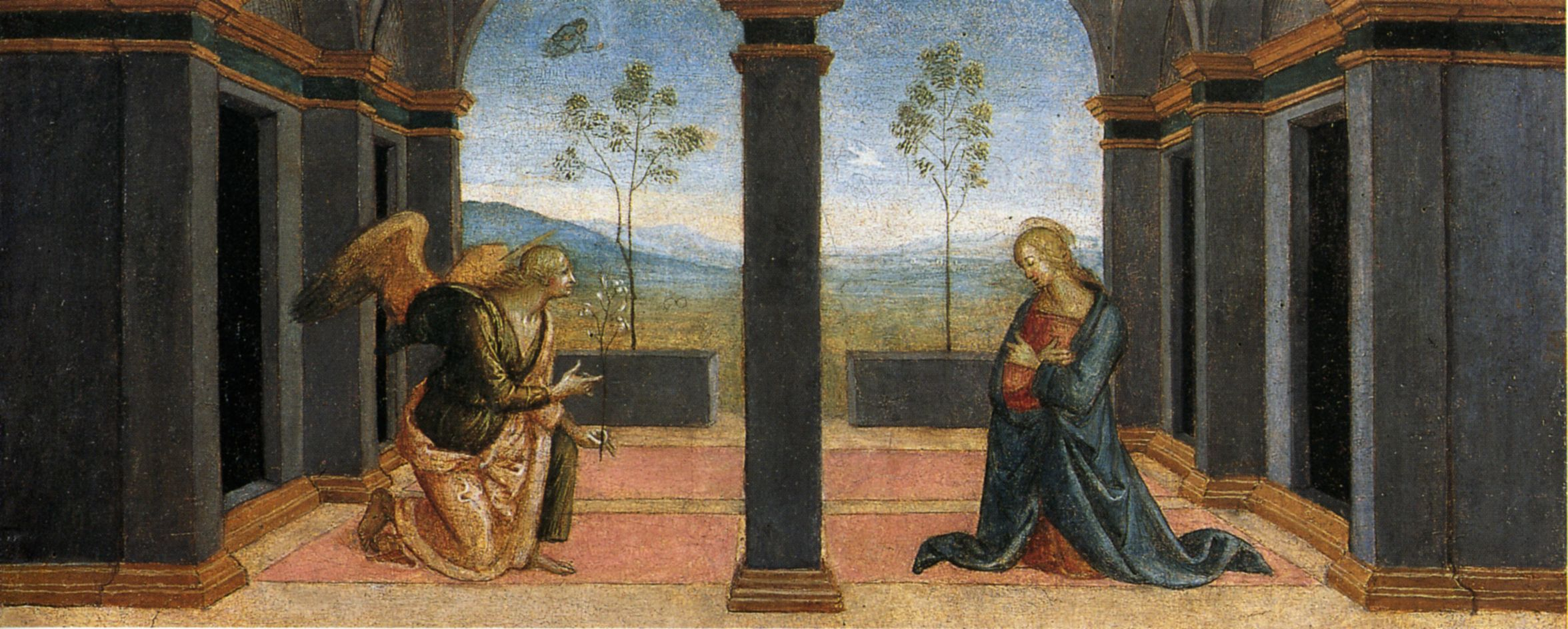
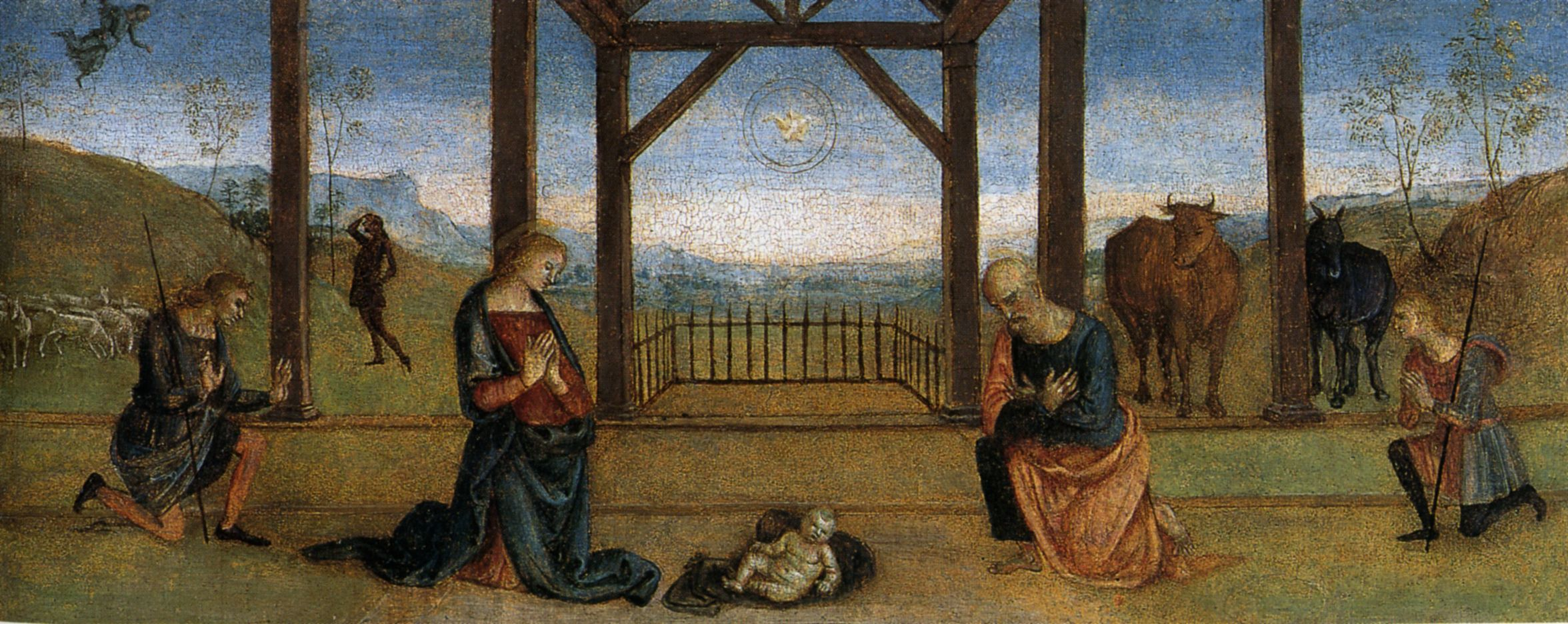
Annunciation and Adoration
