= Apophyge =

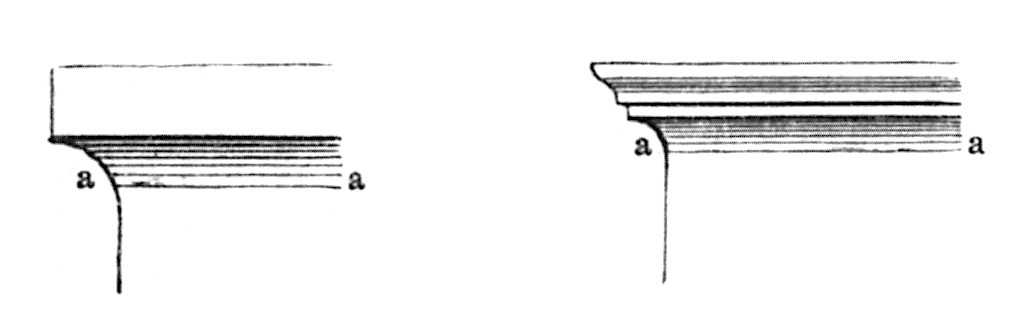
Apophyge.

An apophyge (Greek Ancient Greek: ἀποφυγή, a flying off), in architecture, is the lowest part of the shaft of an Ionic or Corinthian column, or the highest member of its base if the column be considered as a whole. The apophyge is the inverted cavetto or concave sweep, on the upper edge of which the diminishing shaft rests.

It is, in effect, a curved join between the column shaft and the slightly larger section of the column to which the shaft joins. It bridges the two radii to avoid a sharp change. This was likely done to avoid cracking of the marble in ancient structures.

The apophyge superior is the joining to the capital, while the apophyge inferior is the joining to the base.
