= Ovacuma =

- Village
- Location within Turkey
- Coordinates: 41°27′N 32°45′E
- Country: Turkey
- Province: Karabük
- District: Safranbolu
- Elevation: 360 m (1,180 ft)
- Population (2022): 380
- Time zone: UTC+3 (TRT)
- Postal code: 78640
- Area code: 0370

Ovacuma is a village in Safranbolu District of Karabük Province, Turkey. Its population is 380 (2022). Before the 2013 reorganisation, it was a town (belde). The town is situated in a mountainous area along a valley of a creek with the same name. The distance to Safranbolu is 28 kilometres (17 mi) and the distance to Karabük is 35 kilometres (22 mi). The town was formed by merging seven neighbouring villages in 1998, and it is quite dispersed. The main economic activity of the town depends on forestry.
