= Safranbolu District =

District of Karabük Province, Turkey

- District
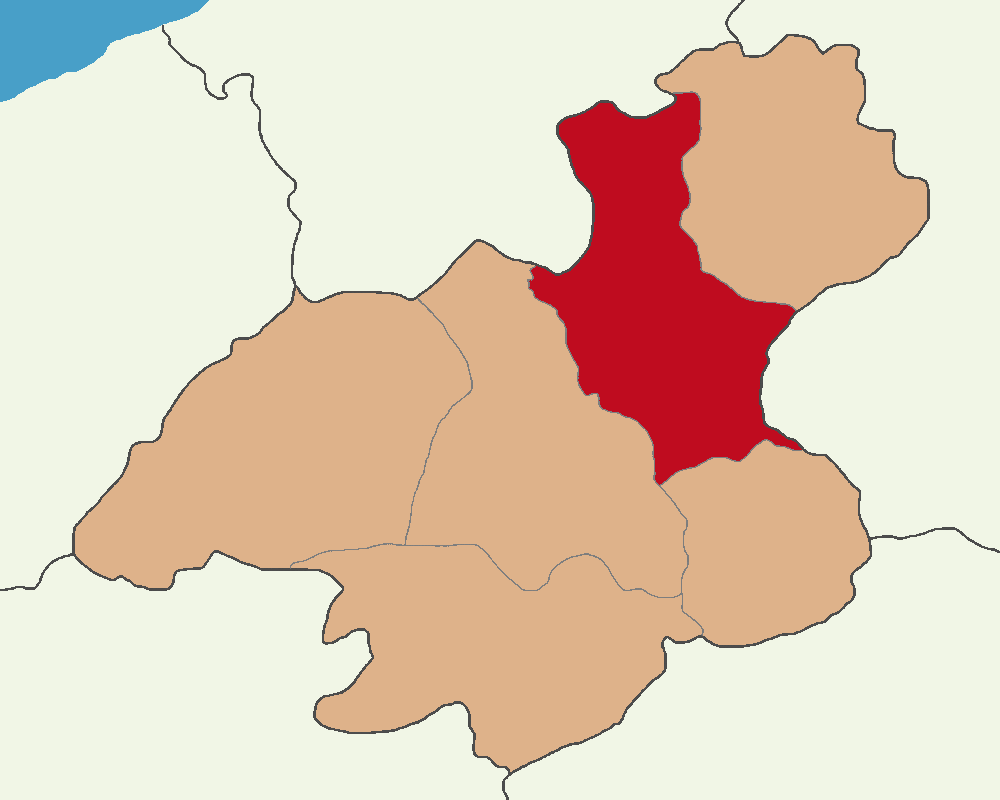
- Map showing Safranbolu District in Karabük Province

- Location in Turkey
- Coordinates: 41°15′N 32°41′E
- Country: Turkey
- Province: Karabük
- Seat: Safranbolu

Government
  - Kaymakam: Şaban Arda Yazıcı
- Area: 750 km^{2} (290 sq mi)
- Population (2022): 70,409
  - Density: 94/km^{2} (240/sq mi)
- Time zone: UTC+3 (TRT)
- Website: www.safranbolu.gov.tr

Safranbolu District is a district of the Karabük Province of Turkey. Its seat is the town of Safranbolu. Its area is 750 km^{2}, and its population is 70,409 (2022).

== Composition ==
There is one municipality in Safranbolu District:

- Safranbolu

There are 60 villages in Safranbolu District:

- Ağaçkese
- Akkışla
- Akören
- Alören
- Aşağıçiftlik
- Aşağıdana
- Aşağıgüney
- Bağcığaz
- Bostanbükü
- Cabbar
- Çatak
- Çavuşlar
- Çerçen
- Çıraklar
- Cücahlı
- Danişment
- Davutobası
- Değirmencik
- Dereköy
- Düzce
- Gayza
- Geren
- Gökpınar
- Gündoğan
- Hacıhasan
- Hacılarobası
- Harmancık
- İnceçay
- Kadıbükü
- Karacatepe
- Karapınar
- Karıt
- Kehler
- Kırıklar
- Konarı
- Kuzyakahacılar
- Kuzyakaköseler
- Kuzyakaöteköy
- Navsaklar
- Nebioğlu
- Oğulören
- Örencik
- Ovacuma
- Ovaköseler
- Pelitören
- Sakaralan
- Sarıahmetli
- Satköy
- Sırçalı
- Sine
- Tayyip
- Tintin
- Tokatlı
- Toprakcuma
- Üçbölük
- Yazıköy
- Yolbaşı
- Yörükköy
- Yukarıçiftlikköy
- Yukarıdana
