= Ovolo =

Convex molding in classical architecture

The quarter-round cross-sectional profile of the fundamental design element, the ovolo, in an unadorned molding, showing also with its resulting shadow pattern.

The ovolo or echinus is a convex decorative molding profile used in architectural ornamentation. Its profile is a quarter to a half of a more or less flattened circle.

The 1911 edition of Encyclopædia Britannica says:

adapted from Ital. uovolo, diminutive of uovo, an egg; other foreign equivalents are Fr. ove, échine, quart de rond; Lat. echinus... [as used] in architecture, [for] a convex moulding known also as the echinus, which in Classic architecture was invariably carved with the egg and tongue. In Roman and Italian work the moulding is called by workmen a quarter round.

The "egg and tongue" referred to, also known as egg-and-dart, egg-and-anchor, or egg-and-star, refers to alternating egg and V-shapes enriching the surface of the concave ovolo in many early cases.

The description of ovolo as the fundamental convex quarter-round element underlying or being combined with other elements to compose molding, details on column capitals, and other architectural ornamentation remains in common use, as evidenced by the description by Lewis and Darley (1986) of the ovolo as a "[c]onvex moulding... usually a quarter of a circle in section", which also notes that it is "often enriched with egg and dart or similar ornament". Ovolo adornment by the egg-and-dart element was used on Ionic capitals by ancient Roman and ancient Greek builders (e.g., at the Erechtheion), and continue to adorn capitals of modern buildings built in Classical styles (e.g., the Ionic capitals of the Jefferson Memorial in Washington, D.C.), and to find use in Neoclassical architecture.

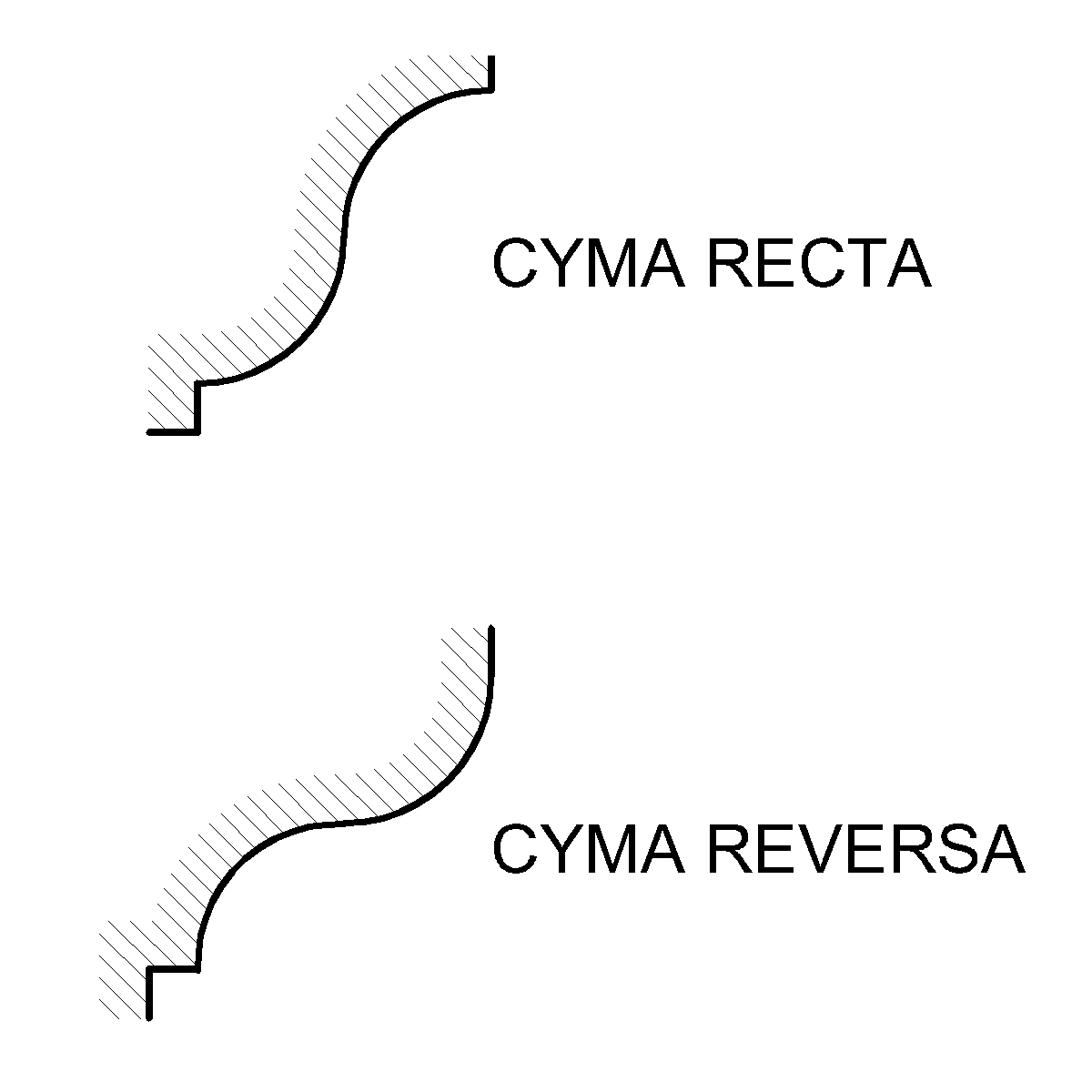
Ogee moulding profiles

The fundamental element of ornamental, architectural molding that is concave (rather than convex like the ovolo) is found in cavetto or hollow chamfering moldings, which also usually presents a quarter-round cross-section, albeit concave. Ovolo and cavetto elements can be combined to form compound moldings; most simply, with the convex ovolo molding below the cavetto, it is known as cyma recta (for its wave-like cross-section), a type of common edge profile commonly referred to as ogee. The compound molding with the concave cavetto below and the convex ovolo above is termed cyma reversa. In modern residential applications, the ovolo profile is often used as the inside edge of stile and rail interior and cabinet doors.

The Britannica article goes on to note that the echinus synonym of ovolo should "not be confounded with the echinus of the Greek Doric capital", which is "of a more varied form and of much larger dimensions than the ovolo, which was only a subordinate moulding."

== See also ==
- Cymatium
