= Sant'Agostino Altarpiece =

Painting by Pietro Perugino

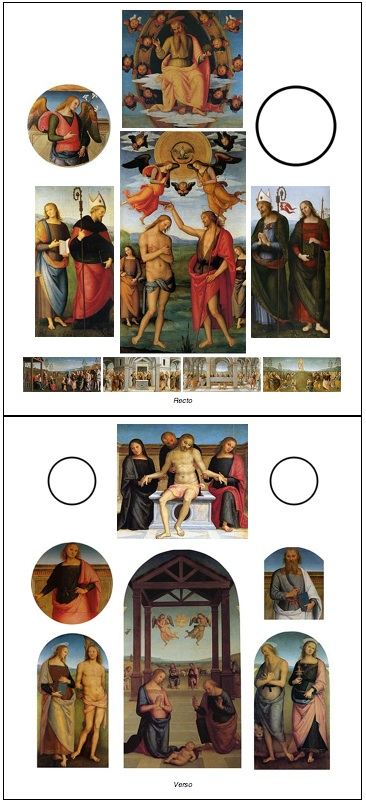
- Reconstruction
- Artist: Perugino
- Year: 1502–1523
- Medium: oil on panel
- Dimensions: 240 cm × 180 cm (94 in × 71 in)

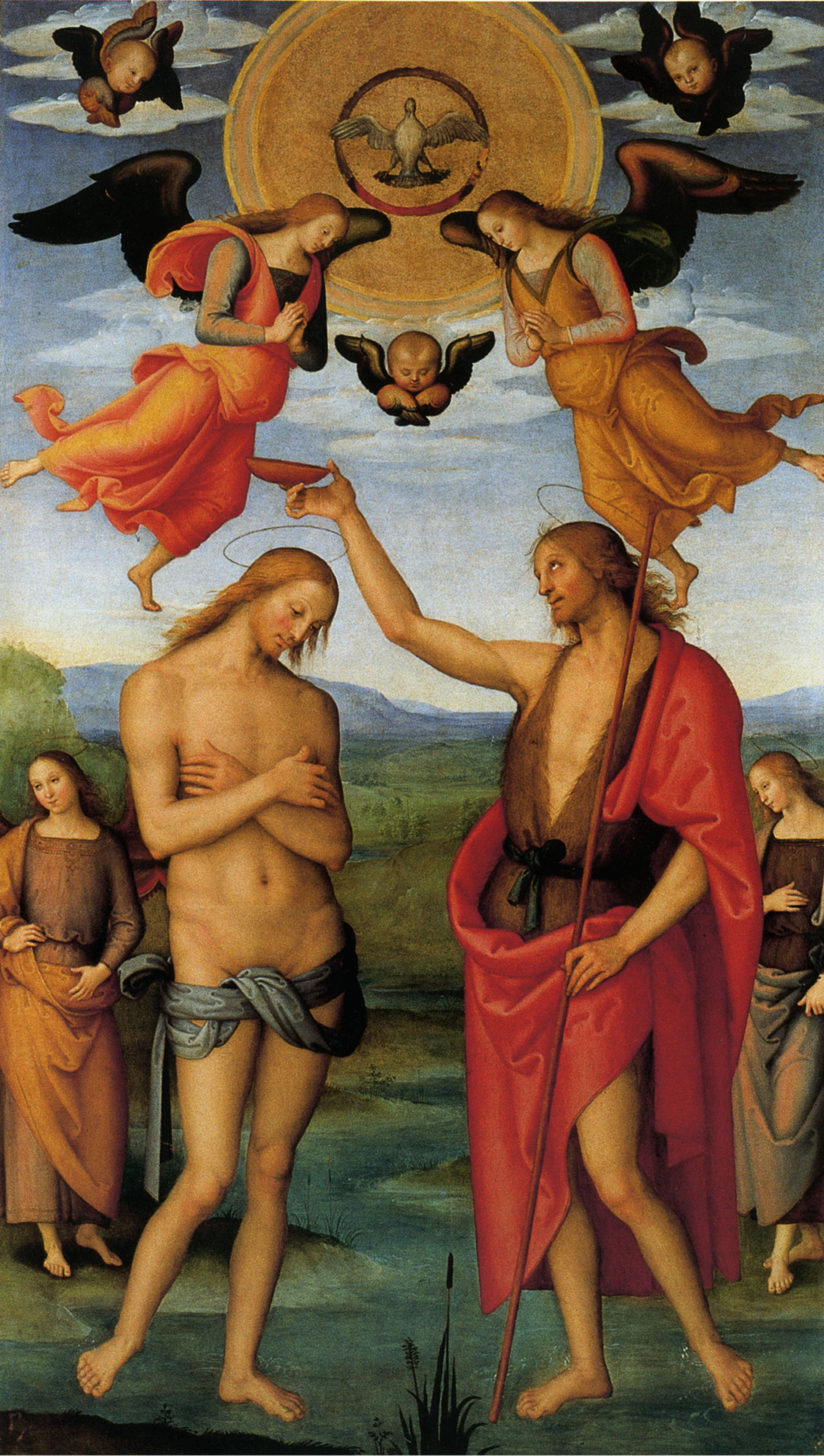
Central panel of the recto: Baptism of Christ.

The Sant'Agostino Altarpiece is a painting by Perugino, produced in two stages between around 1502 and 1512 and then around 1513 to 1523. The altarpiece's 28, 29 or 30 panels were split up during the Napoleonic suppression of religious houses - most of its panels are now in the Galleria Nazionale dell'Umbria in Perugia. It is notable as the painter's last masterwork before he moved into his late phase producing more provincial commissions.

It was commissioned by the monks of Sant'Agostino church in Perugia. The first phase included the artist's peak years and the crisis from 1508 onwards which distanced him from the major artistic centres of Italy. The second phase included the end of those crisis years and after 1520 his final years. The work is often used as a base-line for dating other works from his late period.

The main panel shows the Baptism of Christ in the Jordan by John the Baptist, with the Holy Spirit descending in a gilded nimbus, angels assisting, saints around the scene and the heads of seraphim above. All the panels were held in a frame by Mattia da Reggio, making the altarpiece double-sided. They were placed in the frame as the artist completed them, working up from the predella at the base, the columns, the main panels, an entablature, a cymatium and finally the works flanking the central panel.

== Phases ==
=== First phase ===
This probably corresponds to the side of the altarpiece which faces the church's nave:

- God the Father, 145 × 140 cm, Galleria Nazionale dell'Umbria, Perugia.
- Baptism of Christ, 261 × 146 cm, Galleria Nazionale dell'Umbria, Perugia.
- St John the Evangelist and St Augustine of Hippo, 173 × 91 cm, Musée des Augustins, Toulouse
- St Herculanus and St James the Great, 173 × 91 cm, Musée des Beaux-Arts, Lyon.
- Archangel Gabriel and Virgin, forming an Annunciation scene, two tondos each with a diameter of 102 cm, the former in the Galleria Nazionale dell'Umbria, Perugia and the latter now lost
- Adoration of the Magi, 39.5 × 85 cm, Galleria Nazionale dell'Umbria, Perugia.
- St John the Baptist Preaching, 39.5 × 84 cm, Galleria Nazionale dell'Umbria, Perugia.
- The Wedding Feast at Cana, 39.5 × 84.5 cm, Galleria Nazionale dell'Umbria, Perugia.
- The Presentation in the Temple, 39.5 × 83.5 cm, Galleria Nazionale dell'Umbria, Perugia.

The monks caused very long delays, meaning that the predella was completed by Perugino's studio assistants using drawings by the artist himself. The drawings for the works in the first phase probably used silver-point, which can now be seen under infrared light. All the panels are painted with a single light source coming from the left. Baptism re-uses a composition from the Annunziata Polyptych and the symmetrical angels from Madonna della Consolazione. The flanking panels of the saints show precise draughtsmanship as well as high detail in the flowers and small plants on the ground.

=== Second phase ===
The other side of the altarpiece faced the church's choir and work on its panels began in 1513, delivered at irregular intervals right up to Perugino's death. The cymatium panels on both sides were produced during this phase, with God the Father facing the nave and a Pietà towards the choir - the latter formed a single panel with the flanking tondi of David and Daniel, but was later split up. Apart from these two purely decorative tempera tondi, the rest of the panels show a lack of underdrawing and near-transparent colour to show the contours of the figures - the speed of their execution dates them to Perugino's late period. The rural backgrounds are very simple, with almost no flowers in the foreground to increase focus on the classically influenced figures, in which Perugino seems to have assimilated the style of his old pupil Raphael.

- Adoration of the Shepherds, 263 × 147 cm, Galleria Nazionale dell'Umbria, Perugia.
- St Sebastian and St Irene or Apollina, Museum of Grenoble, Grenoble.
- St Jerome and St Mary Magdalene, 174 × 95 cm, Galleria Nazionale dell'Umbria, Perugia.
- Young Saint with a Sword, 102 cm in diameter, Musée du Louvre, Paris
- St Bartholomew, 89.5 × 74.8 cm, Birmingham Museum and Art Gallery, Birmingham
- Pietà, 144 × 152 cm, Galleria Nazionale dell'Umbria, Perugia.
- David and Daniel, two tondi, each 61 cm in diameter, Galleria Nazionale dell'Umbria, Perugia.

== Bibliography ==
- (in Italian) Vittoria Garibaldi, Perugino, in Pittori del Rinascimento, Scala, Florence, 2004 ISBN 888117099X
- (in Italian) Pierluigi De Vecchi, Elda Cerchiari, I tempi dell'arte, volume 2, Bompiani, Milan, 1999 ISBN 88-451-7212-0
- (in Italian) Stefano Zuffi, Il Quattrocento, Electa, Milan, 2004 ISBN 8837023154
