= Cymatium =

Type of molding in Classical architecture

Cyma molding profile (left) and shadow pattern (right)

In Classical architecture, cymatium (from Greek κυμάτιον 'small wave') is the uppermost molding at the top of the cornice in the classical order. Its profile made of the s-shaped cyma molding (either cyma recta or cyma reversa), combining a concave cavetto with a convex ovolo. It is characteristic of Ionic columns and can appear as part of the entablature, the epistyle or architrave, which is the lintel or beam that rests on the capitals of columns, and the capital itself. Often the cymatium is decorated with a palmette or egg-and-dart ornament on the surface of the molding.

The heights of the parts of the capital are to be so regulated that three of the nine parts and a half, into which it was divided, lie below the level of the astragal on the top of the shaft. The remaining parts are for the cymatium, abacus, and channel. The projection of the cymatium beyond the abacus is not to be greater than the size of the diameter of the eye [of the volute].

In the case of a concave-convex profile, a distinction is made between cyma recta and cyma reversa, with the cyma reversa, the inverted and therefore hanging cyma, being the usual form. Originally, the individual types of cymatia were linked to the corresponding individual building codes and the associated ornament systems and in this way could be clearly distinguished from one another. In the Hellenistic and Roman periods, however, the types mixed, at the same time further refinement and embellishment with numerous details (acanthus, palmettes, medallions) took place.

== See also ==
- Molding (decorative)
