= Safranbolu =

- Municipality
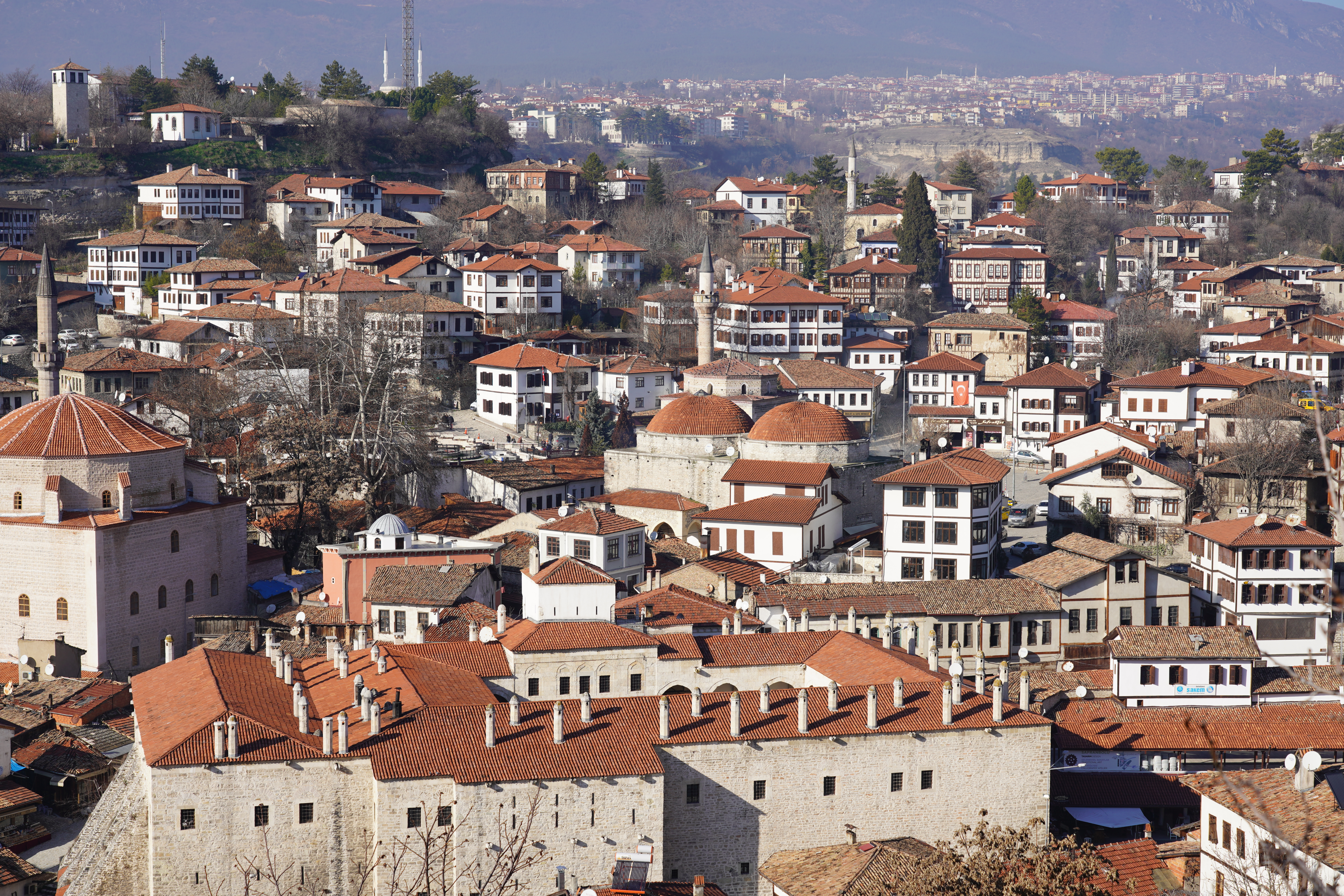
- Town of Safranbolu

- Logo

- Location within Turkey
- Coordinates: 41°14′58″N 32°41′00″E
- Country: Turkey
- Province: Karabük
- District: Safranbolu

Government
  - Mayor: Elif Köse (CHP)
- Elevation: 508 m (1,667 ft)
- Population (2022): 52,999
- Time zone: UTC+3 (TRT)
- Area code: 0370
- Climate: Cfa
- Website: www.safranbolu.bel.tr

UNESCO World Heritage Site
- Criteria: Cultural: ii, iv, v
- Reference: 614
- Inscription: 1994 (18th Session)
- Area: 193 ha (480 acres)

Safranbolu is a town in Karabük Province in the Black Sea region of Turkey. It is the seat of Safranbolu District. Its population is 52,999 (2022). It is about 9 km north of the city of Karabük, 200 kilometres (120 mi) north of Ankara and about 100 km south of the Black Sea coast. The town's historic names in Greek were Theodoroupolis (Θεοδωρούπολις, i.e. city of Theodorus or Theodora), Dadybra (Δάδυβρα) and later Saphrampolis (Σαφράμπολις). Its former names in Turkish were Zalifre and Taraklıborlu. It was part of Kastamonu Province until 1923 and Zonguldak Province between 1923 and 1995. The town lies at an elevation of 508 m (1,667 ft).

The town became known for its resistance against Suleiman II, who besieged it for four months, destroyed its houses and poisoned its water supply, until its residents negotiated a surrender due to famine, in which they were allowed to leave undisturbed.

According to the Ottoman General Census of 1881/82-1893, the kaza of Safranbolu had a total population of 52,523, consisting of 49,197 Muslims and 3,326 Greeks.

The Old Town preserves many historic buildings, with 1008 registered historical artifacts. These are: 1 private museum, 25 mosques, 5 tombs, 8 historical fountains, 5 Turkish baths, 3 caravanserais, 1 historical clock tower, 1 sundial and hundreds of houses and mansions. Also, there are mounds of ancient settlements, rock tombs and historical bridges. The Old Town is situated in a deep ravine in a fairly dry area in the rain shadow of the mountains. The New Town can be found on the plateau about two kilometers west of the Old Town.

The name of the town derives from "saffron" and the Greek word polis (πόλις) meaning "city", since Safranbolu was a trading place and a center for growing saffron. Today, saffron is still grown at the village of Davutobası to the east of Safranbolu, with a road distance of 22 kilometres.

Safranbolu was added to the list of UNESCO World Heritage sites in 1994 due to its well-preserved Ottoman era houses and architecture.

== Gallery ==
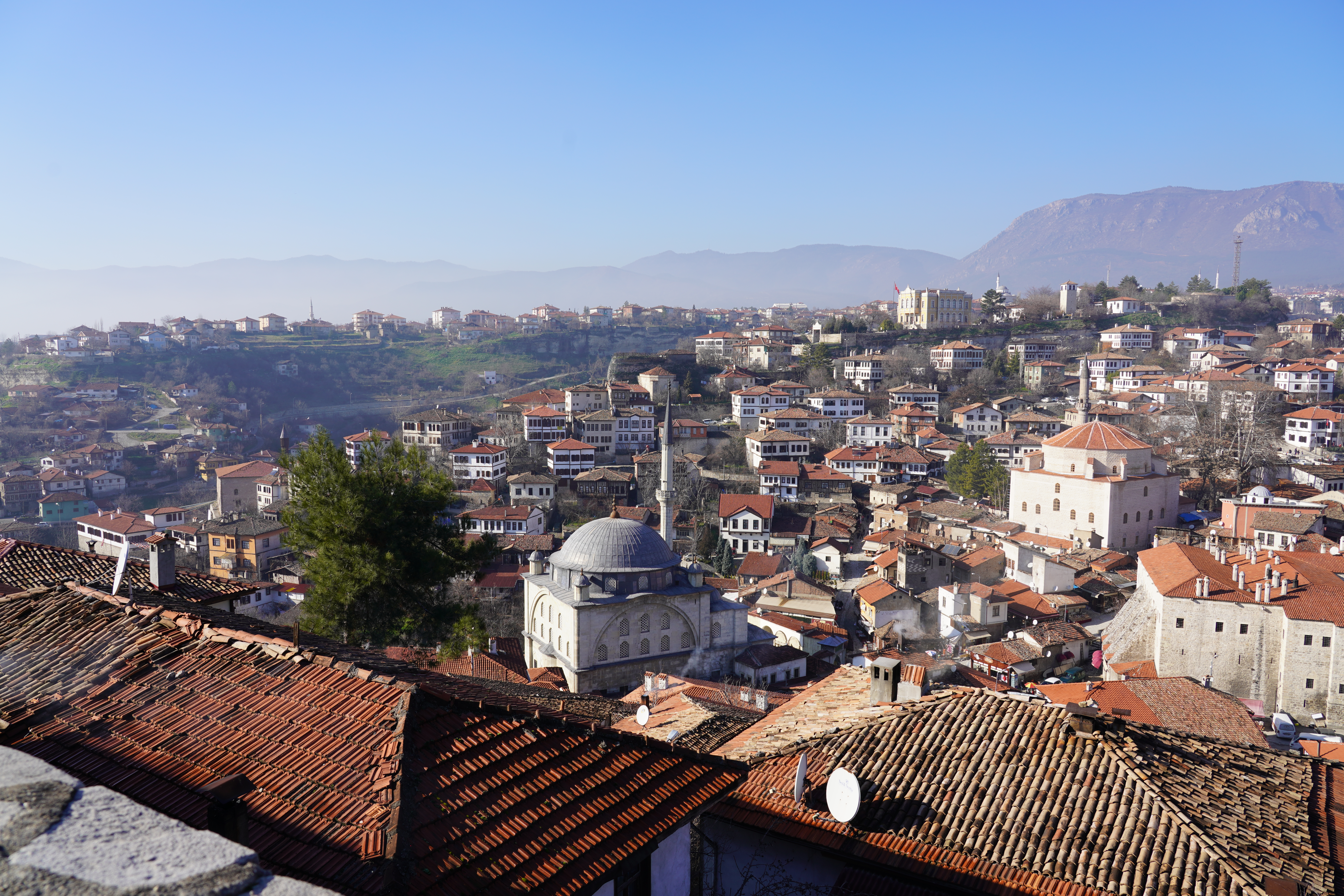

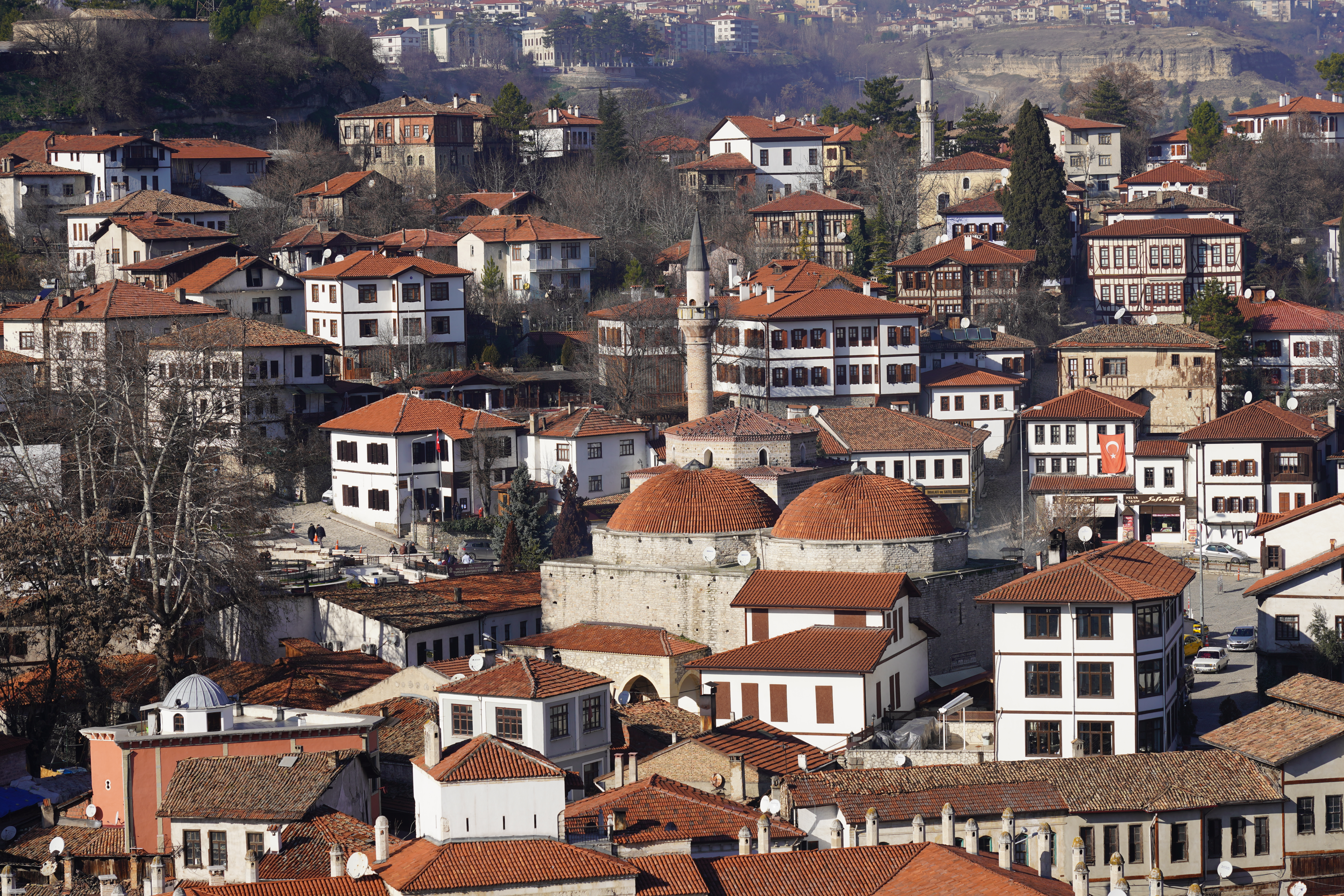

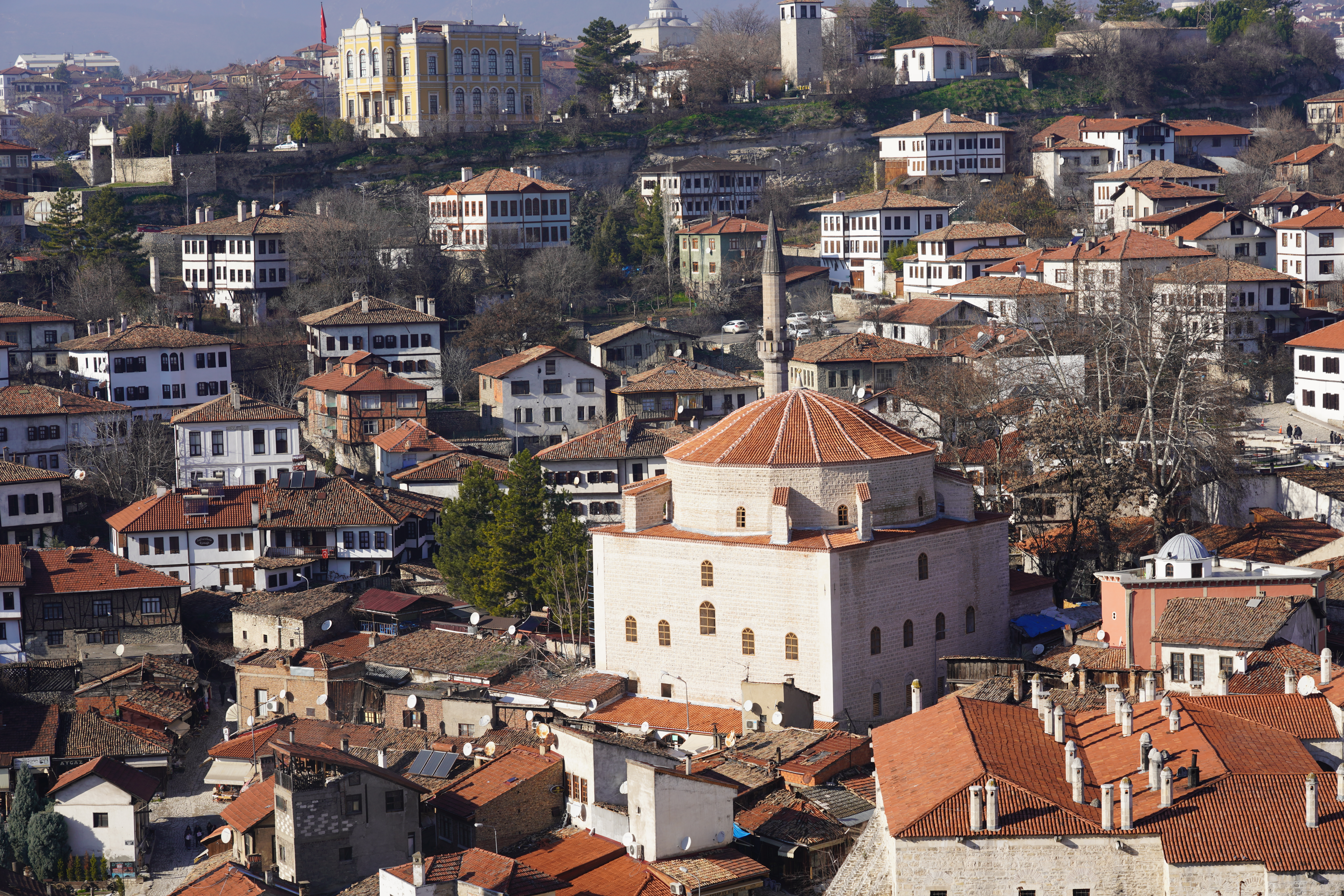

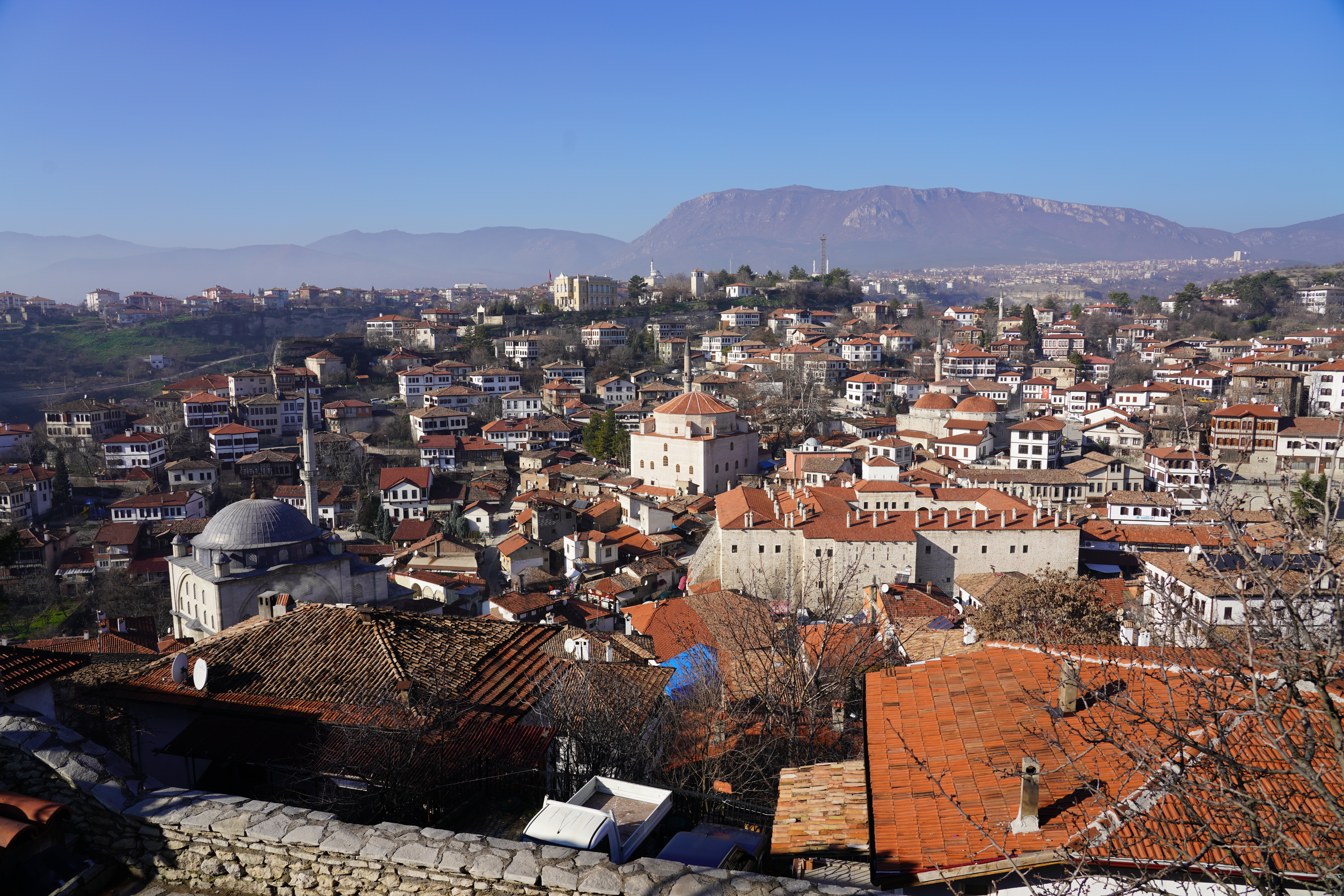

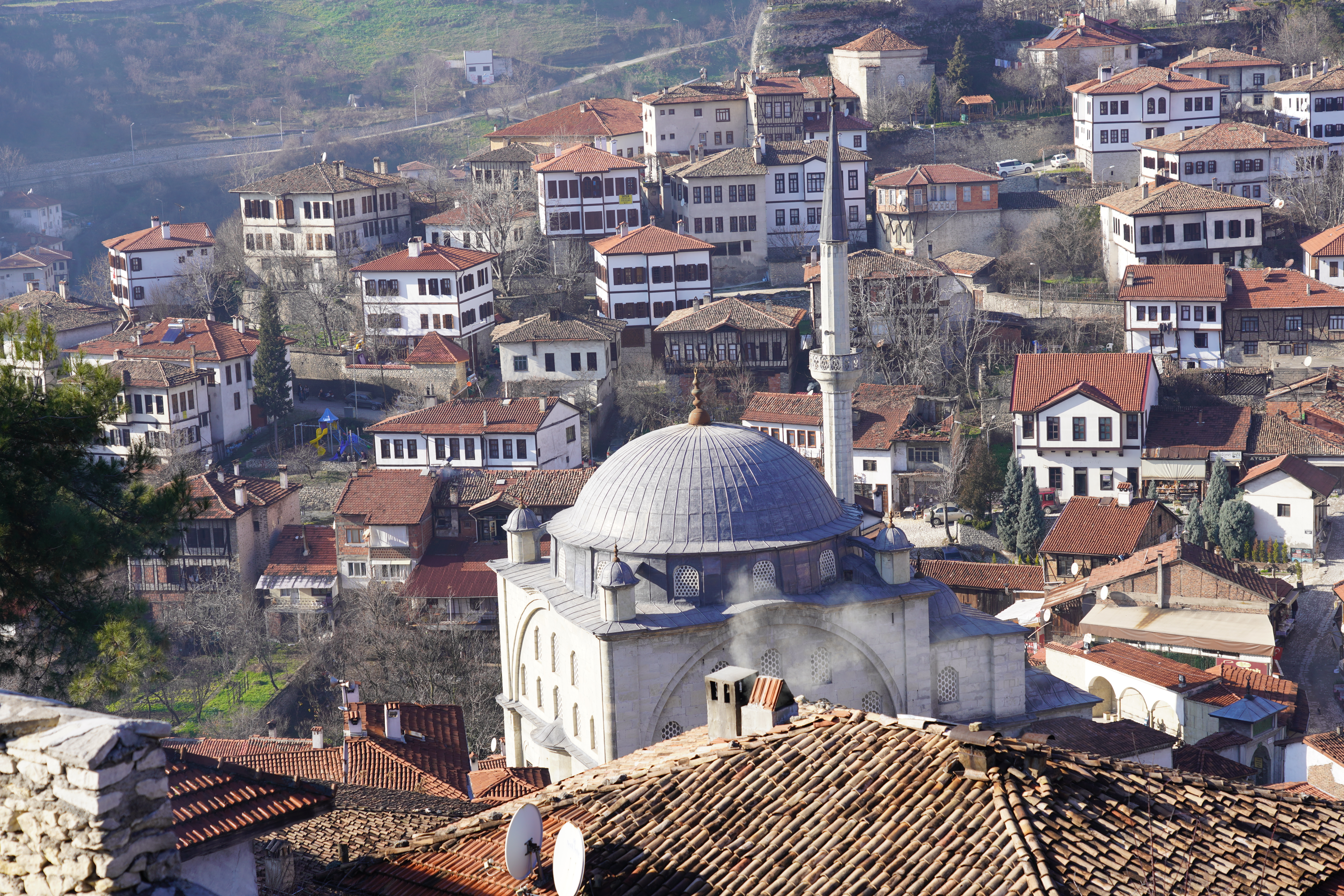

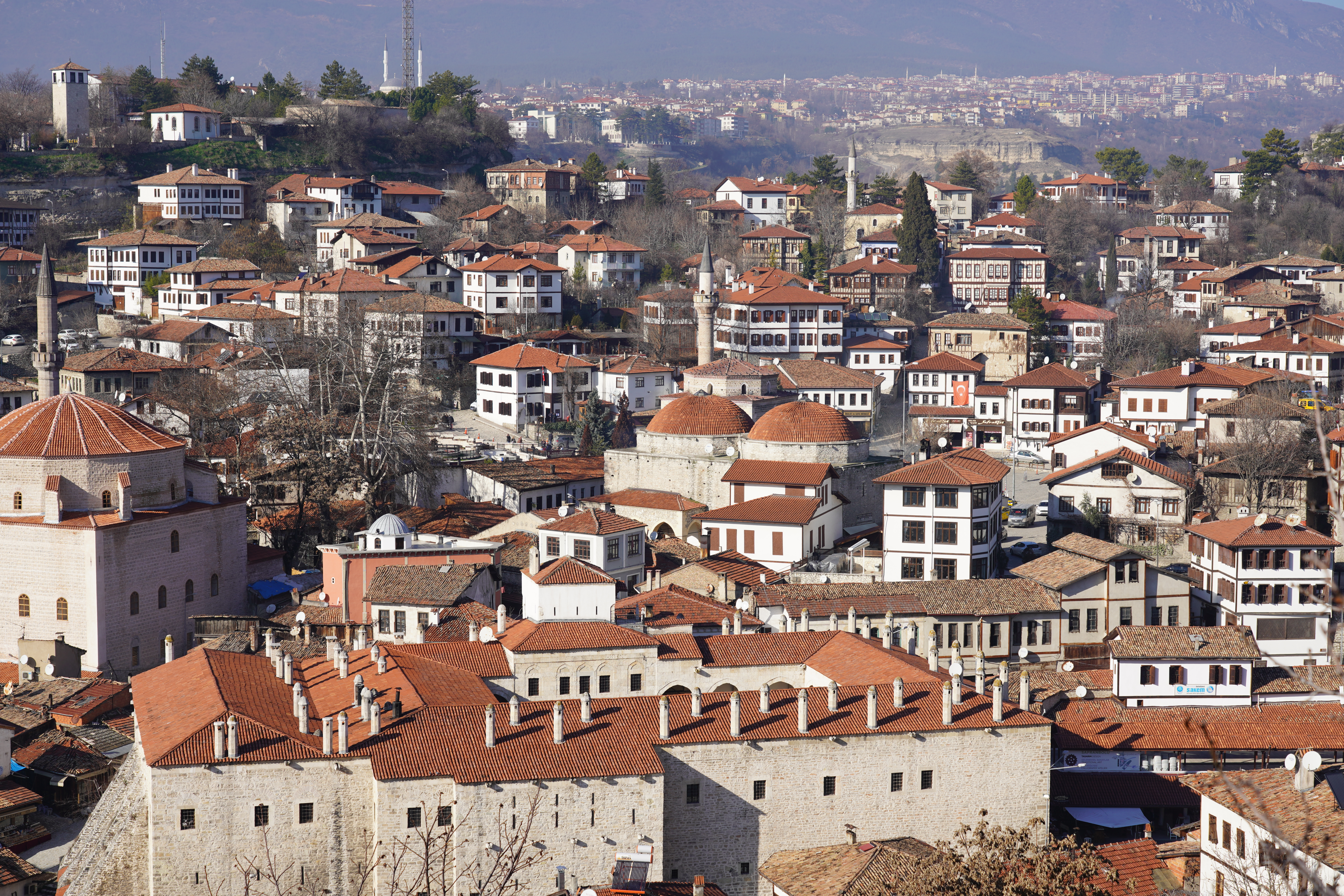

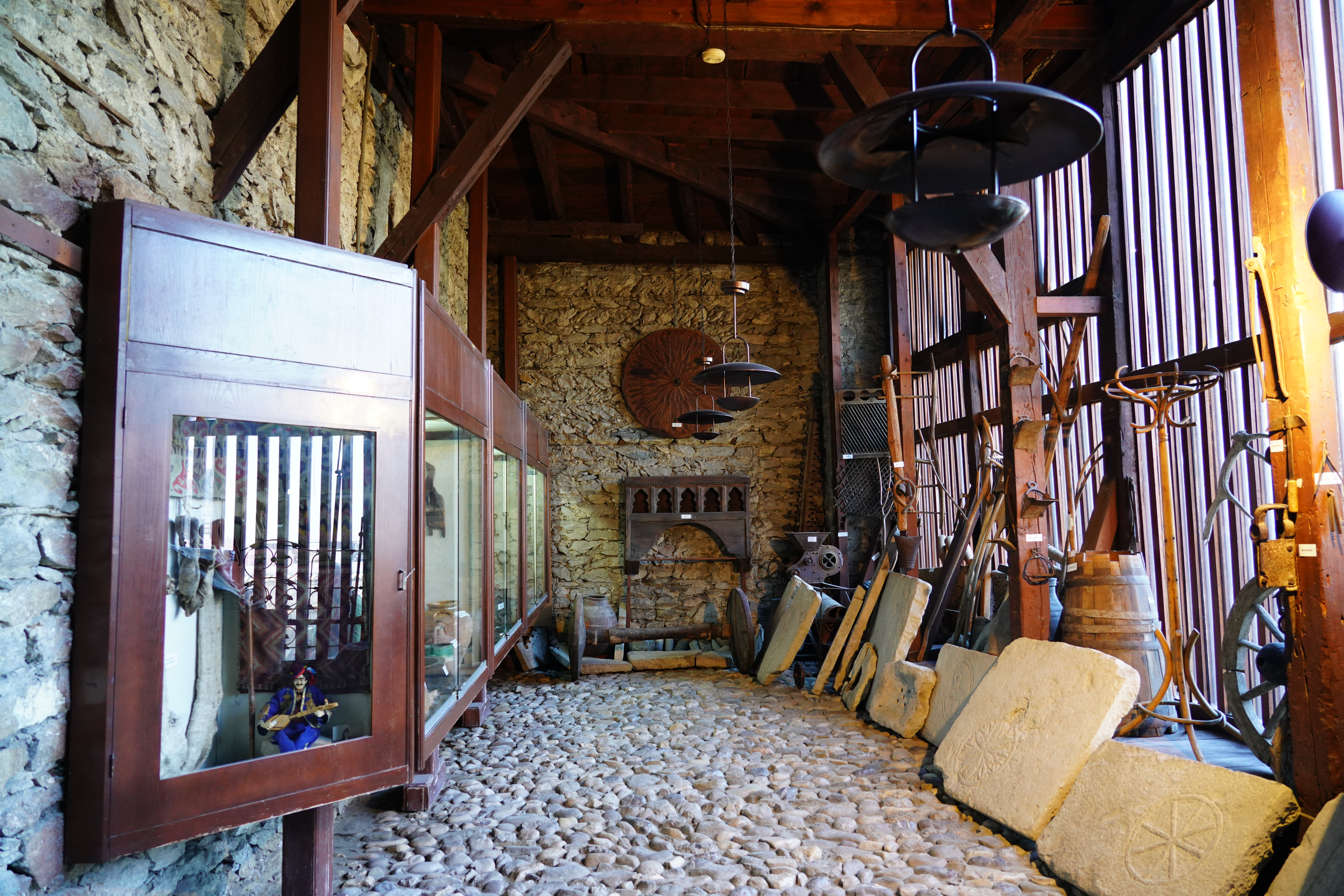

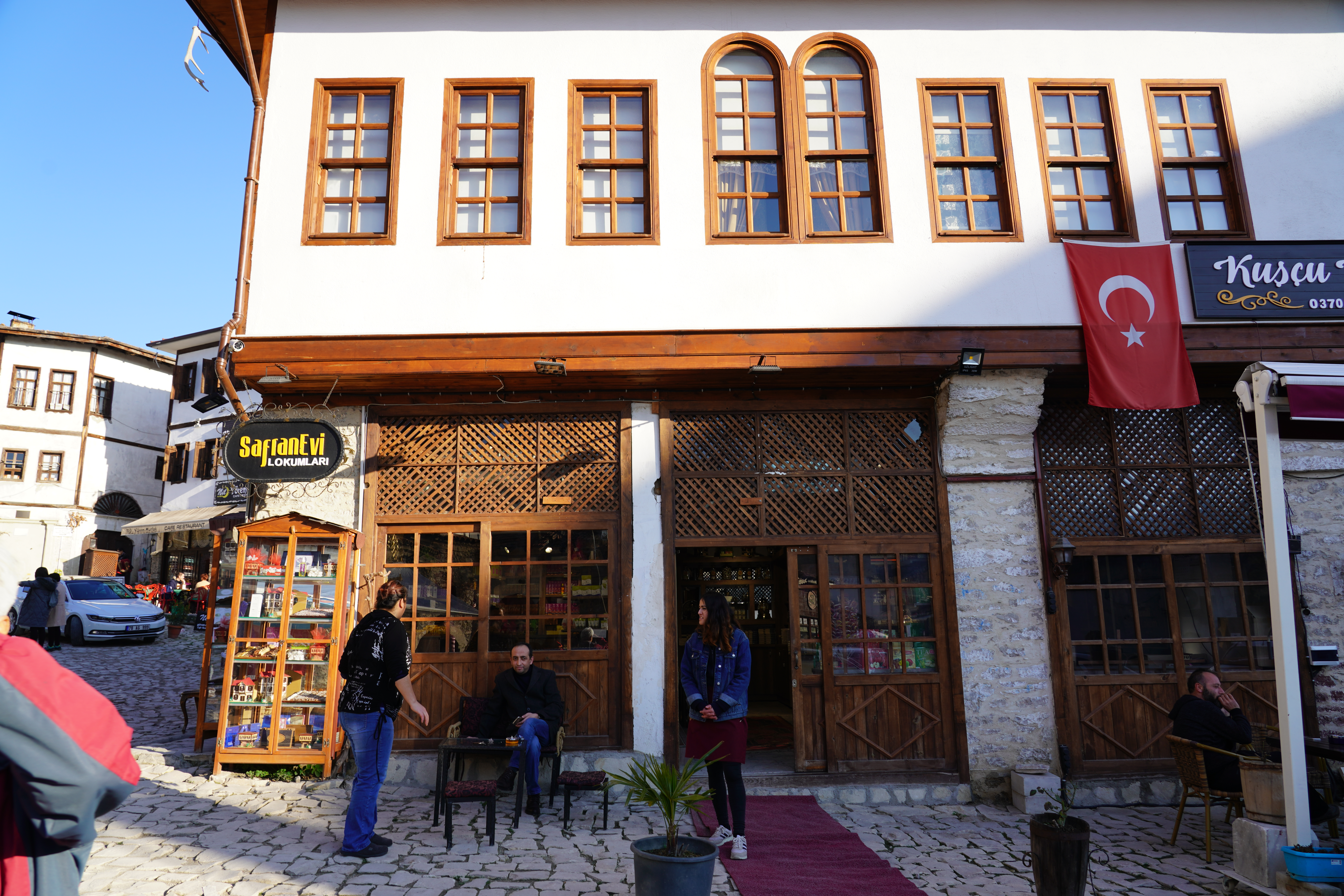

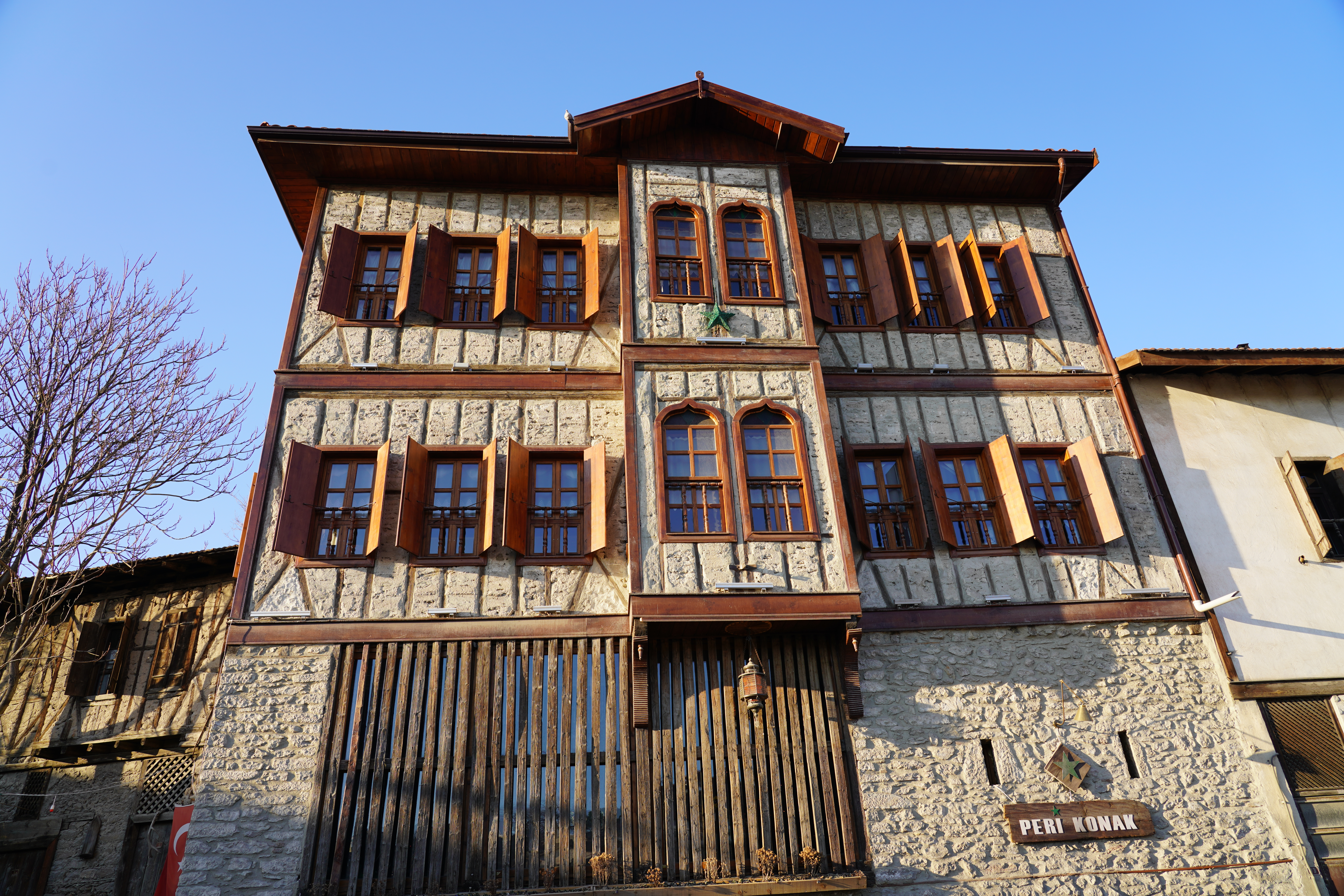

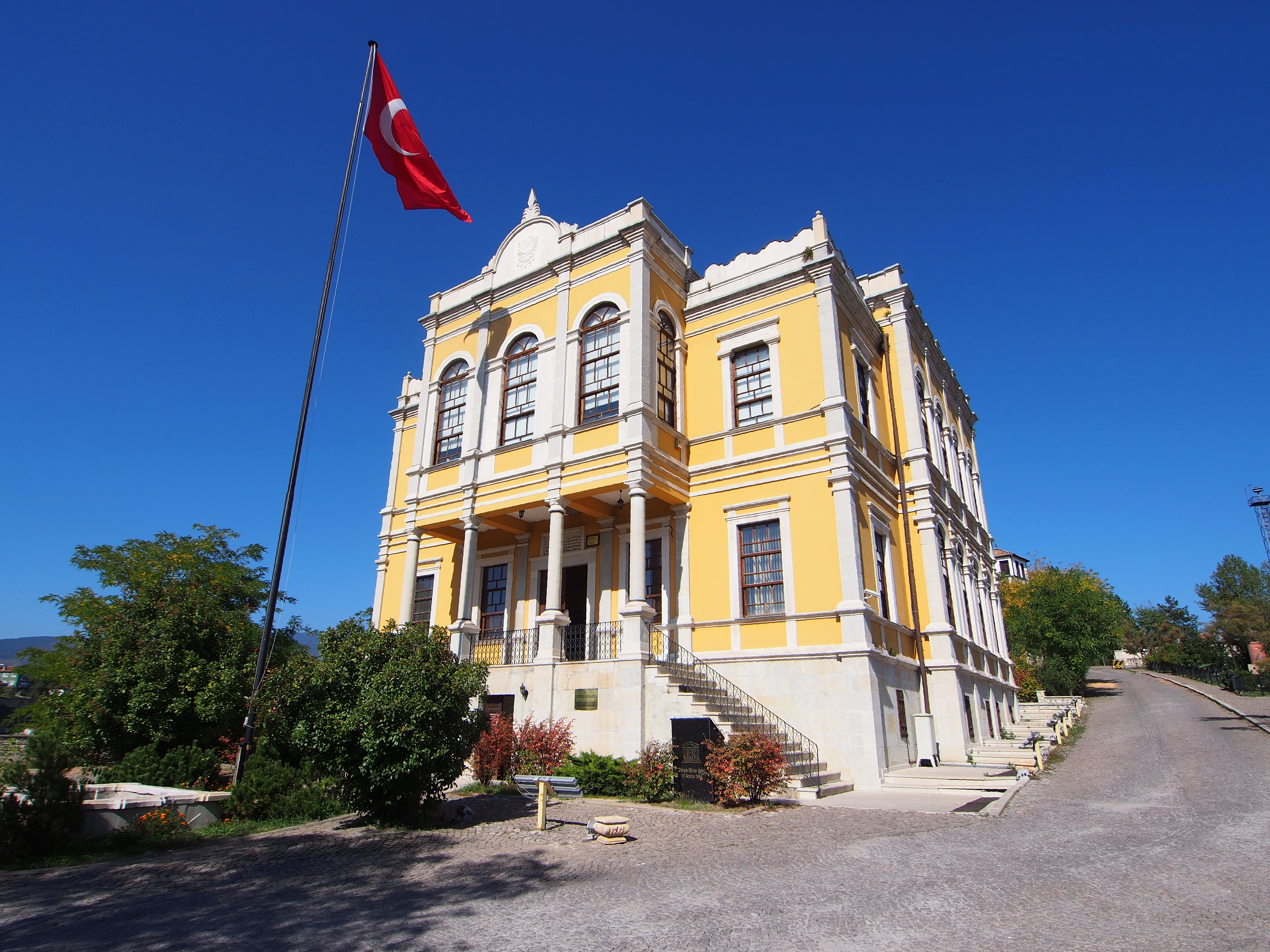
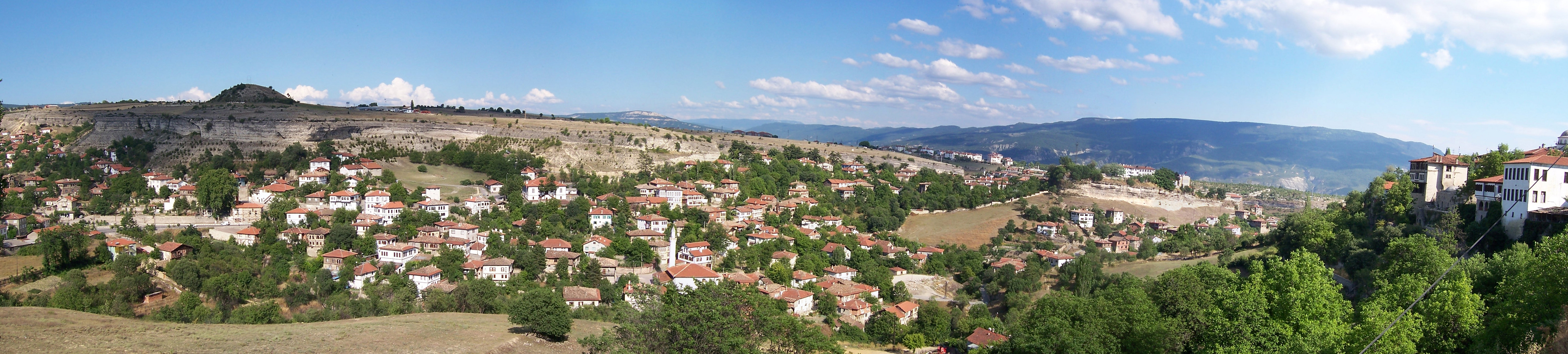
A panoramic view from the historical town

== Sister cities ==
- Yelabuga, Russia.
- Ohrid, North Macedonia

== Notable natives ==
- Karabaşzade Hüseyin Efendi (Cinci Hoca) - Mentor of Ottoman Sultan İbrahim in the 17th century
- Safranbolulu Izzet Mehmet Pasha, 18th century Ottoman Grand Vizier, in office 1794–1798
- Türker İnanoğlu (b. 1936), film producer
- Ali Gümüş (1940–2015), President of the Wrestling Commission of the International Sports Press Association (Association Internationale de la Presse Sportive, AIPS), journalist and author

== See also ==
- Amasya
- List of World Heritage Sites in Turkey
