= Cavetto =

Concave architectural moulding

Cavetto moulding

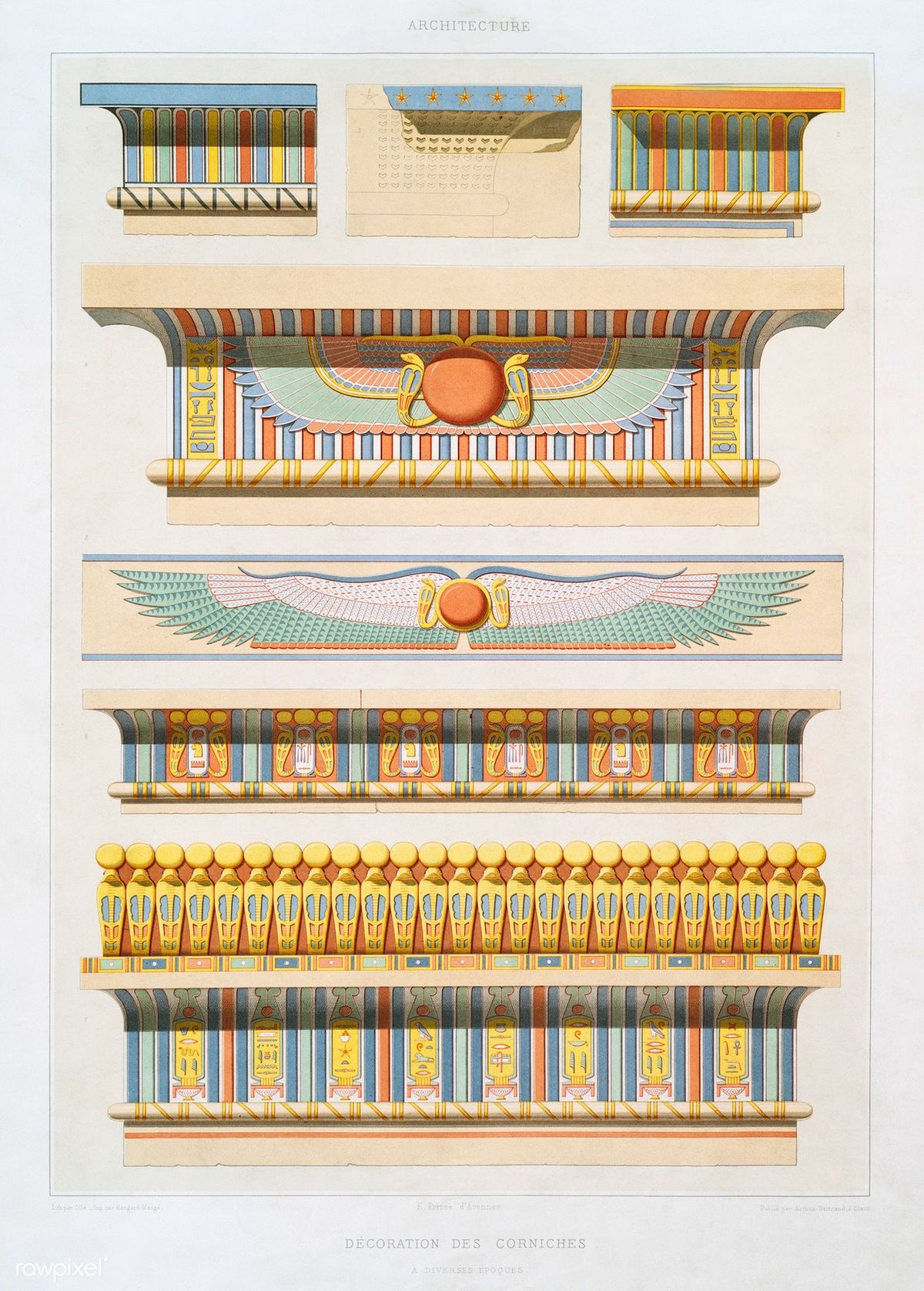
Illustrations of various examples of ancient Egyptian cornices, all of them having cavettos

A cavetto is a concave moulding with a regular curved profile that is part of a circle, widely used in architecture as well as furniture, picture frames, metalwork and other decorative arts. In describing vessels and similar shapes in pottery, metalwork and related fields, "cavetto" may be used of a variety of concave curves running round objects. The word comes from Italian, as a diminutive of cave, from the Latin for "hollow" (it is the same root as cave). A vernacular alternative is "cove", most often used where interior walls curve at the top to make a transition to the roof, or for "upside down" cavettos at the bases of elements.

The cavetto moulding is the opposite of the convex, bulging, ovolo, which is equally common in the tradition of Western classical architecture. Both bring the surface forward and are often combined with other elements of moulding. Usually, they include a curve through about a quarter-circle (90°). A concave moulding of about a full semi-circle is known as a "scotia".

Only a minor element of decoration in classical architecture, the prominent cavetto cornice is a common feature of the ancient architecture of Egypt and the Ancient Near East.

== Architecture ==
Ancient Egyptian architecture made special use of large cavetto mouldings as a cornice, with only a short fillet (plain vertical face) above, and a torus moulding (convex semi-circle) below. This cavetto cornice is sometimes also known as an "Egyptian cornice", "hollow and roll" or "gorge cornice", and has been suggested to be a reminiscence in stone architecture of the primitive use of bound bunches of reeds as supports for buildings, the weight of the roof bending their tops out.

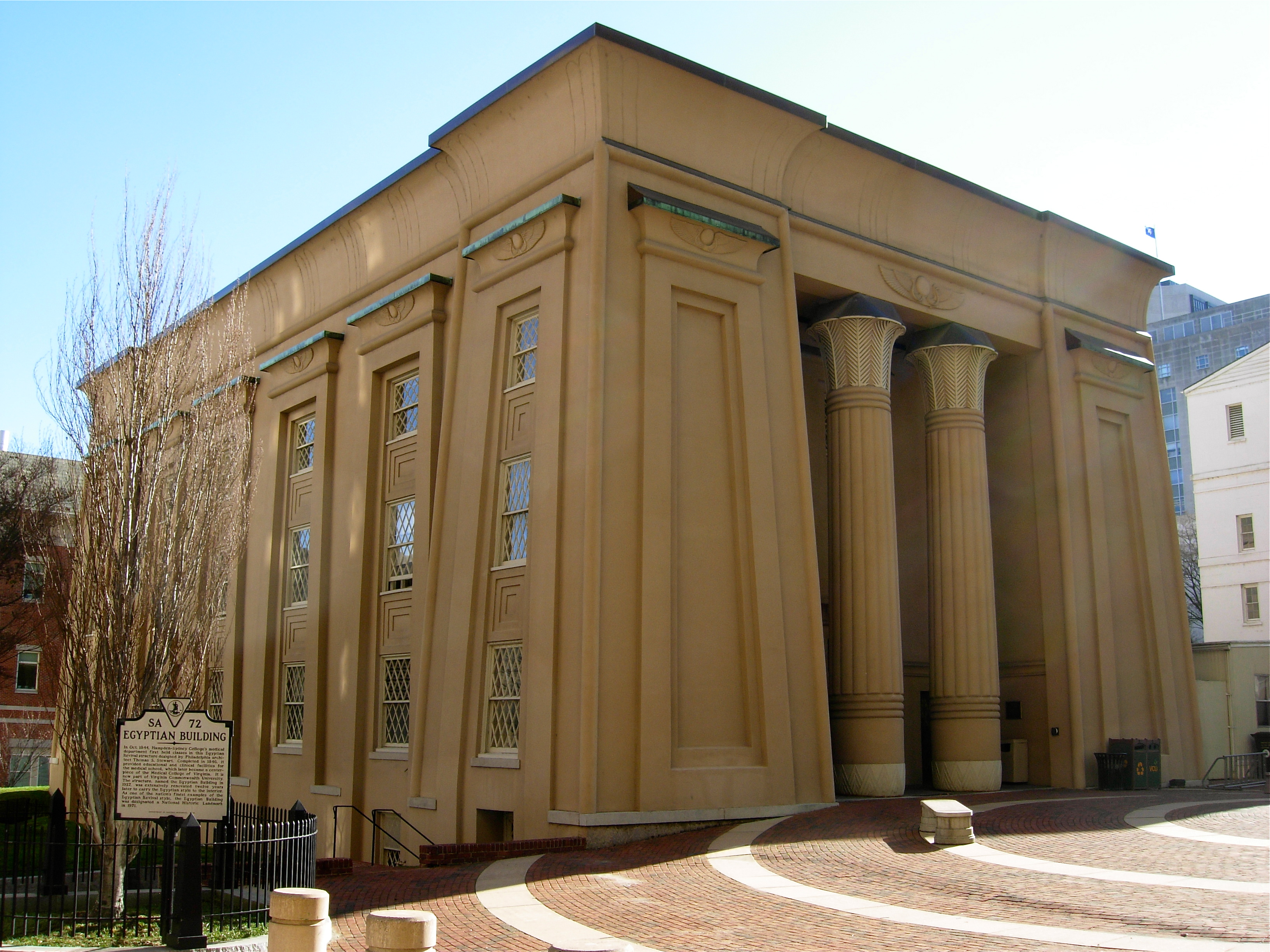
The Egyptian Building (1845) in Richmond, Virginia, with massive cavetto cornice and bell capitals

Many types of Egyptian capitals for columns are essentially cavettos running round the shaft, often with added decoration. These include the types known as "bell capitals" or "papyrus capitals". These features are often reproduced in Egyptian Revival architecture, as in the Egyptian Building (1845) in Richmond, Virginia.

The cavetto cornice, often forming less than a quarter-circle, influenced Egypt's neighbours and as well as appearing in early Greek architecture, it is seen in Syria and ancient Iran, for example at the Tachara palace of Darius I at Persepolis, completed in 486 BC. Inspired by this precedent, it was then revived by Ardashir I (r. 224–41 AD), the founder of the Sasanian dynasty.

The cavetto took the place of the Greek cymatium in many Etruscan temples, often painted with vertical "tongue" patterns, and combined with the distinctive "Etruscan round moulding", often painted with scales.

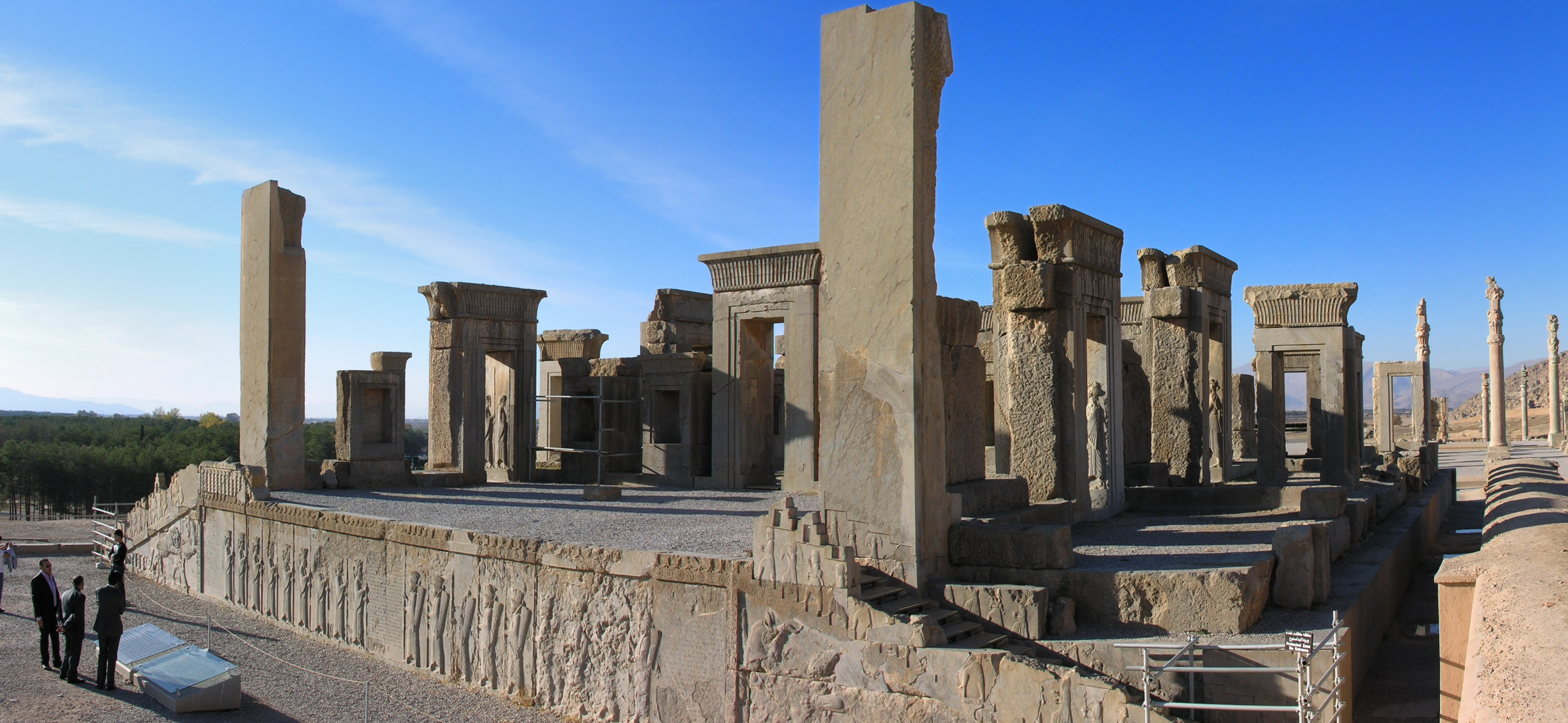
The Tachara palace of Darius I at Persepolis, completed in 486 BC

This emphasis on the cavetto was very different from its role in mature Ancient Greek architecture, where cavetto elements were relatively small and subordinated to essentially vertical elements, setting the style for the subsequent Western classical tradition. Often an essentially cavetto section is heavily decorated, in Gothic architecture often smothering the shape beneath.

In general, the Greeks made much more use of the cyma moulding, where a cavetto and ovolo were placed one above the other to produce an "S" shape; the cymatium using this was a standard part of the cornice in the classical Ionic order, and often used elsewhere. There are two forms, depending on which curve is uppermost: in the cyma recta, the cavetto is on top, in the cyma reversa, the ovolo. A cavetto alone was sometimes employed in the place of the cymatium of a cornice, as in the Doric order of the Theatre of Marcellus in Rome, one of the standard models for revived classical architecture from the Renaissance onwards. But small cavetto mouldings were normal at various places, including integrated ones, not distinguished as a distinct zone by lines or borders, at the bottom of the shaft of columns, beginning the transition to the wider base. These are called an apophyge, or "concave sweep".

Claude Perrault, one of the architects of Louis XIV's rebuilding of the Louvre Palace, especially the Louvre Colonnade, explained in his architectural textbook Ordonnance for the five kinds of columns after the method of the Ancients (1683) why he had replaced a cavetto with a cyma in his illustration of the Doric capital: "a cavetto is not as strong and is more readily broken than the other molding".

Ovolo moulding and resulting shadow pattern

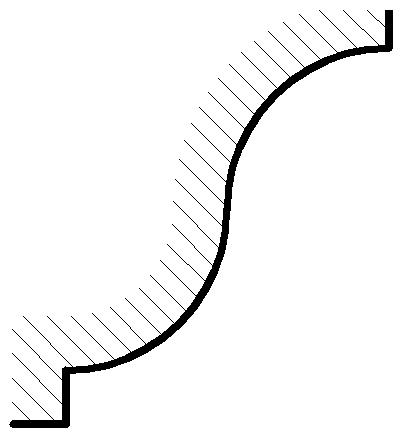
Cyma recta, with cavetto above ovolo

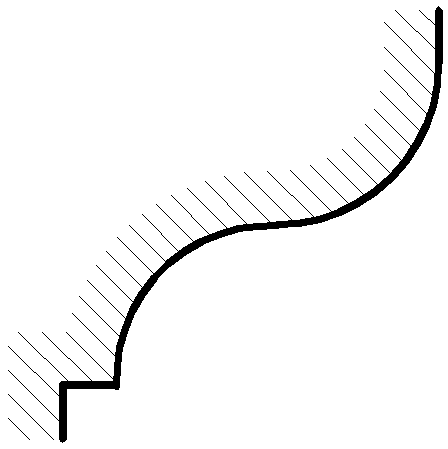
Cyma reversa, with ovolo above cavetto

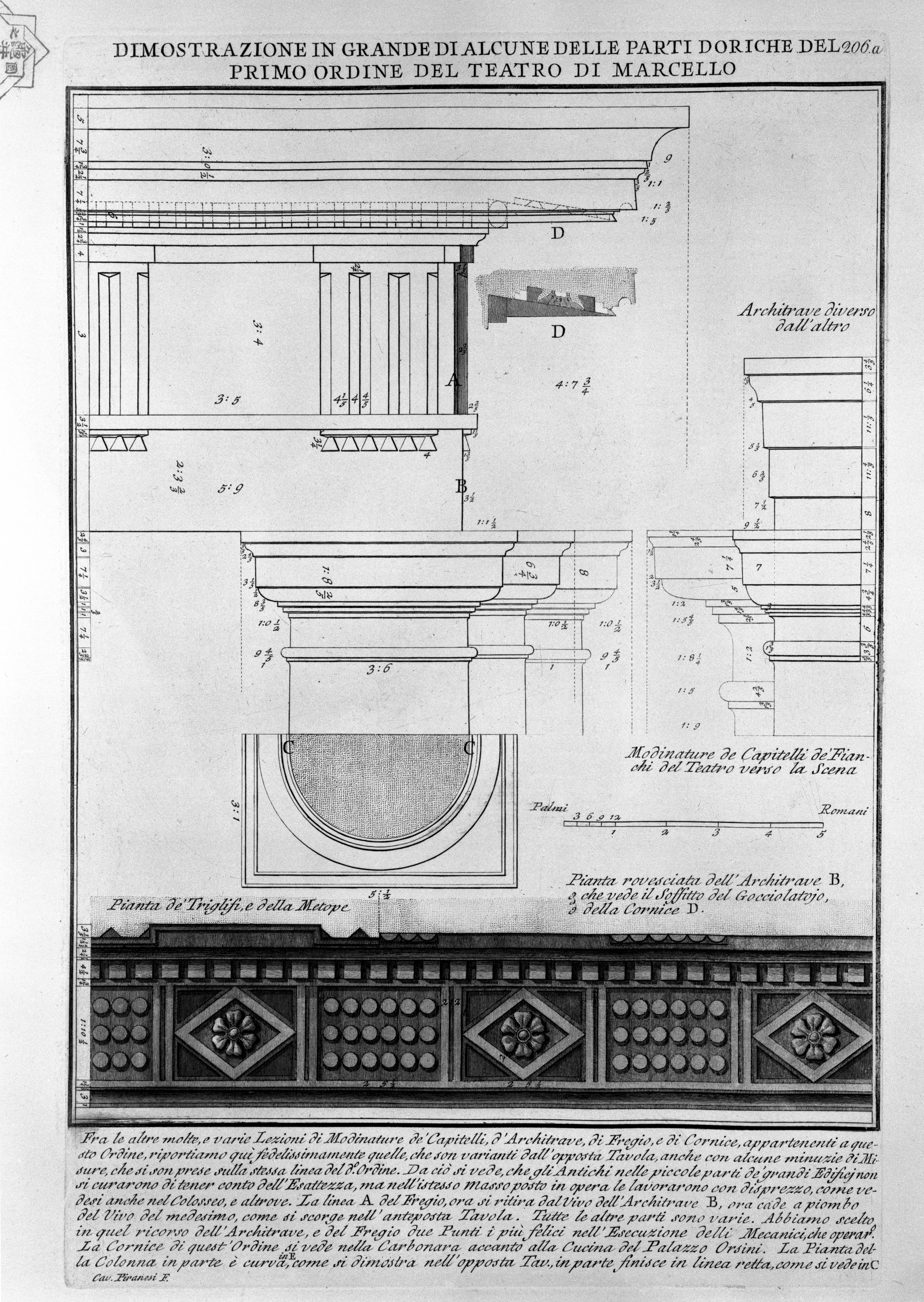
The Doric order of the Theatre of Marcellus in Rome, etched by Giovanni Battista Piranesi.

== Vessels ==
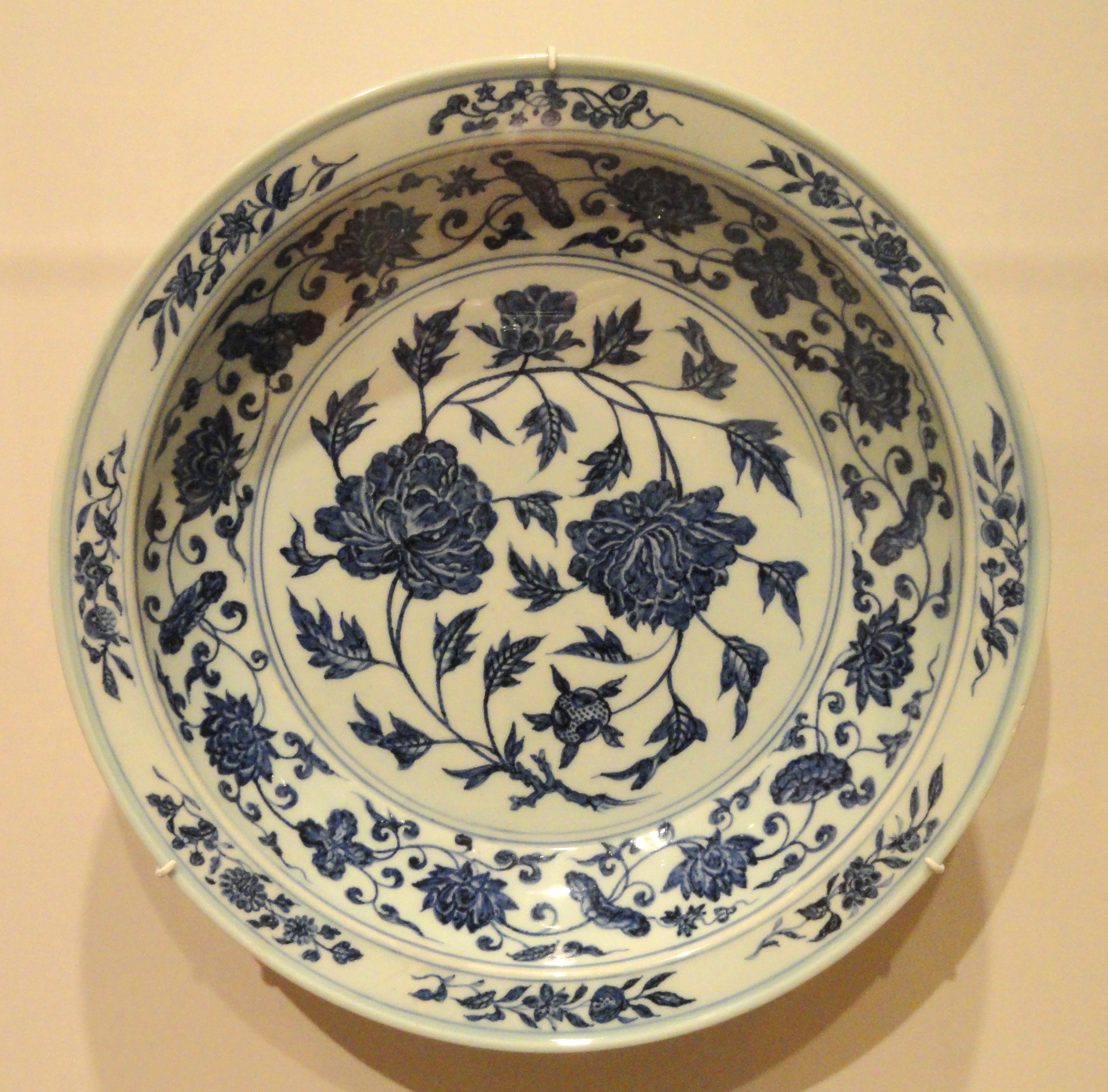
Ming dynasty dish in blue and white porcelain. The cavetto is demarcated by pairs of thin blue lines, and has running scroll decoration, different to that on either side of it in the flat middle and rim.

In plates and other flattish shapes, cavetto is used for the curving area linking the base and the rim. This is the case whether the rim is a broad flat surface (typical 20th-century Western plate), or merely the edge of the cavetto (typical modern cereal bowl). Normally, the term refers to the top surface of the vessel; if the underside is meant (where the curve is now convex), that may be described as "under the cavetto", "under-cavetto" and so forth.

The cavetto is very often left undecorated, but may have decoration of a different sort from the middle or a flat rim, and the term is typically used when it is necessary to describe this. In complicated pottery shapes, where the normal vocabulary of mouldings is appropriate, cavetto may be used in that sense for any concave curving section.

In the terminology of archaeology, especially relating to pottery (and generally not used of pottery after antiquity, or outside archaeology), a cavetto zone or cavetto is a "sharp concavity encircling the body of a vessel", and also a "deep but narrow neck", both used in relation to mainly upright vessels for storing or cooking food.

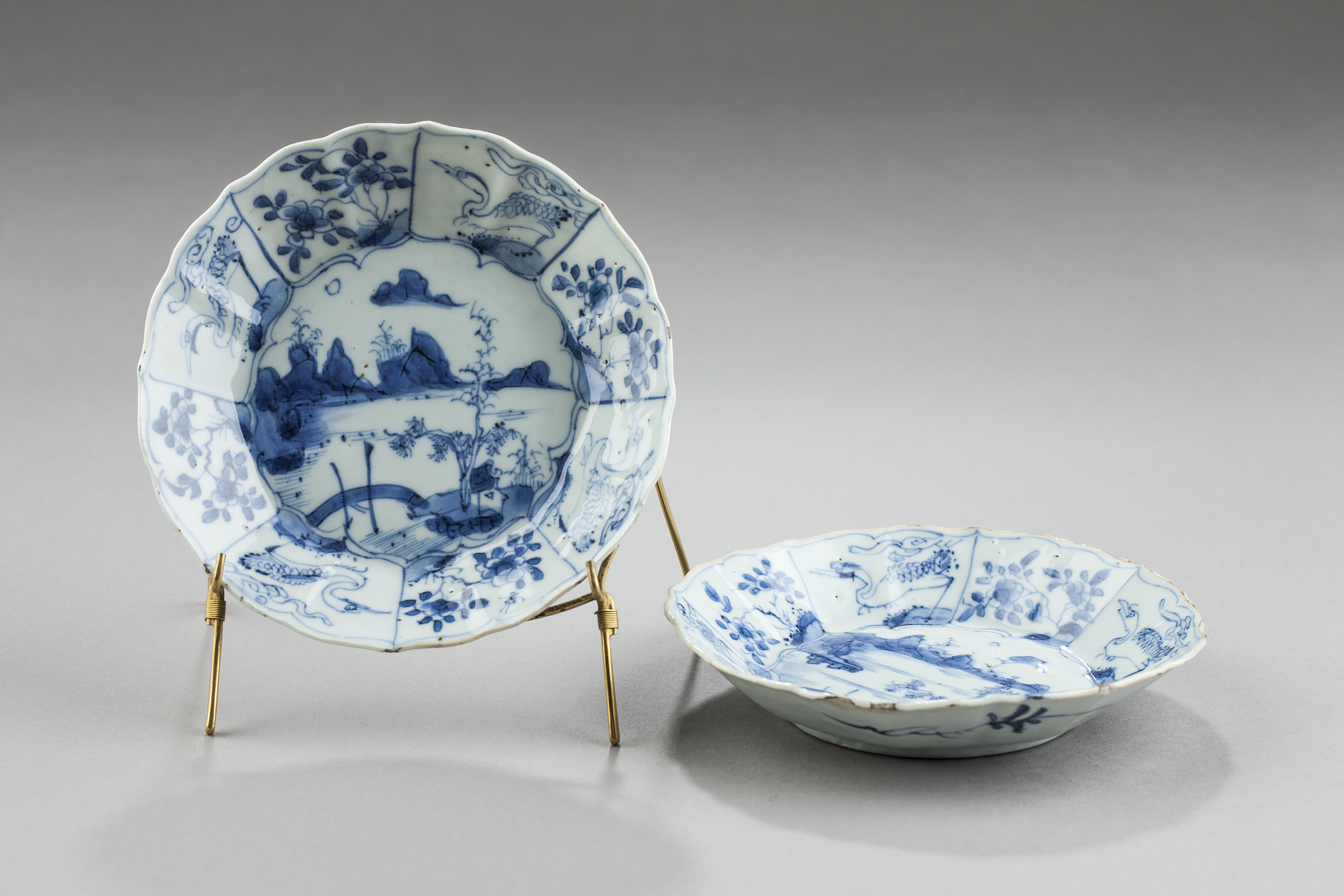
Pair of bowls with cavettos and no distinct rim. The decorated under-cavetto can be seen at right.

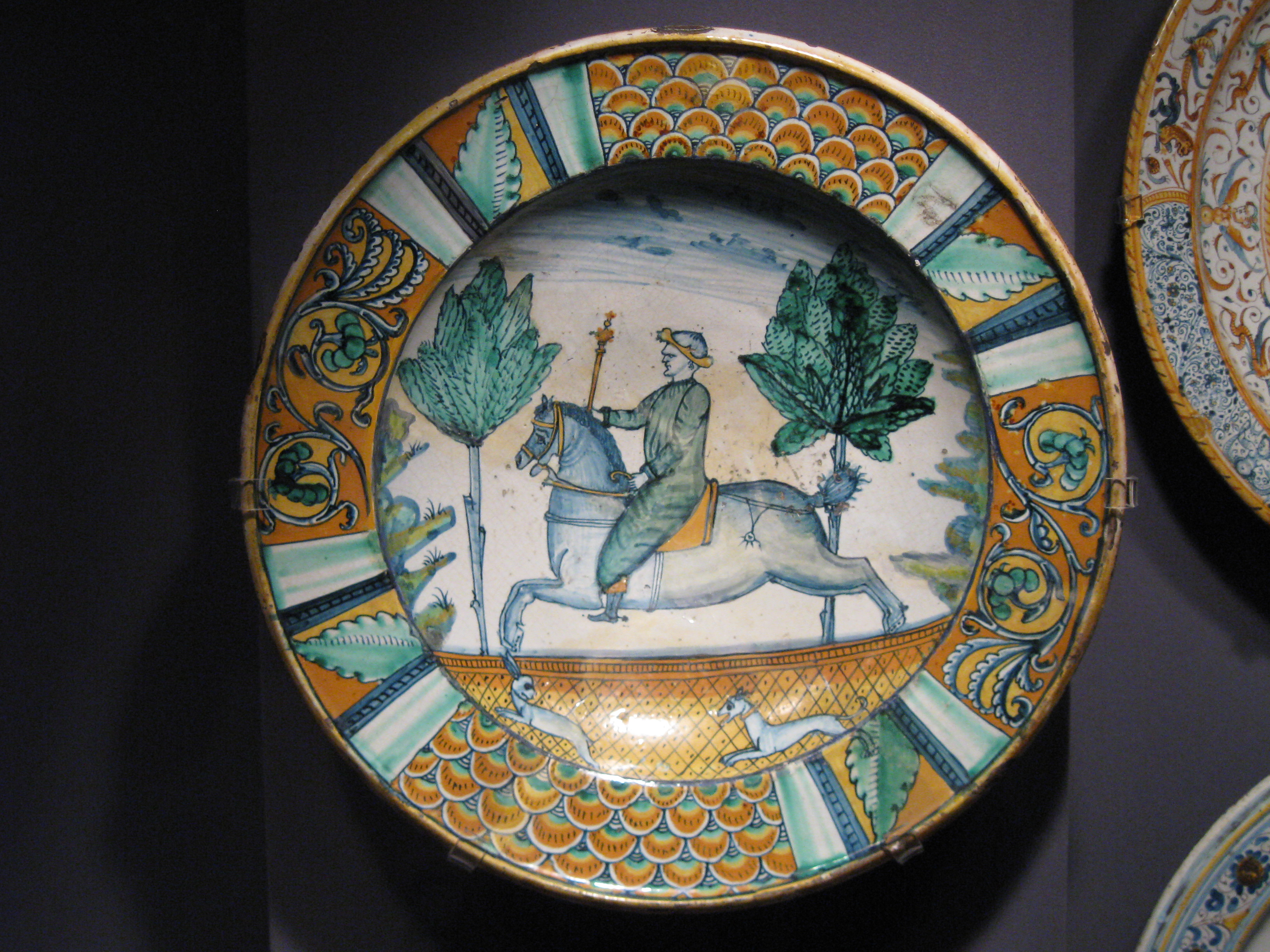
Here, the main decoration continues over the cavetto

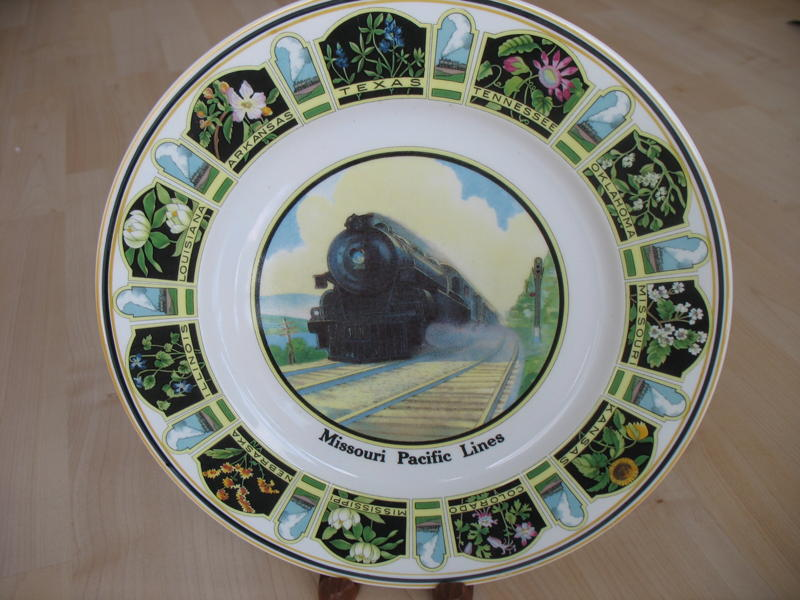
Here, the cavetto is left plain, apart from an inscription.

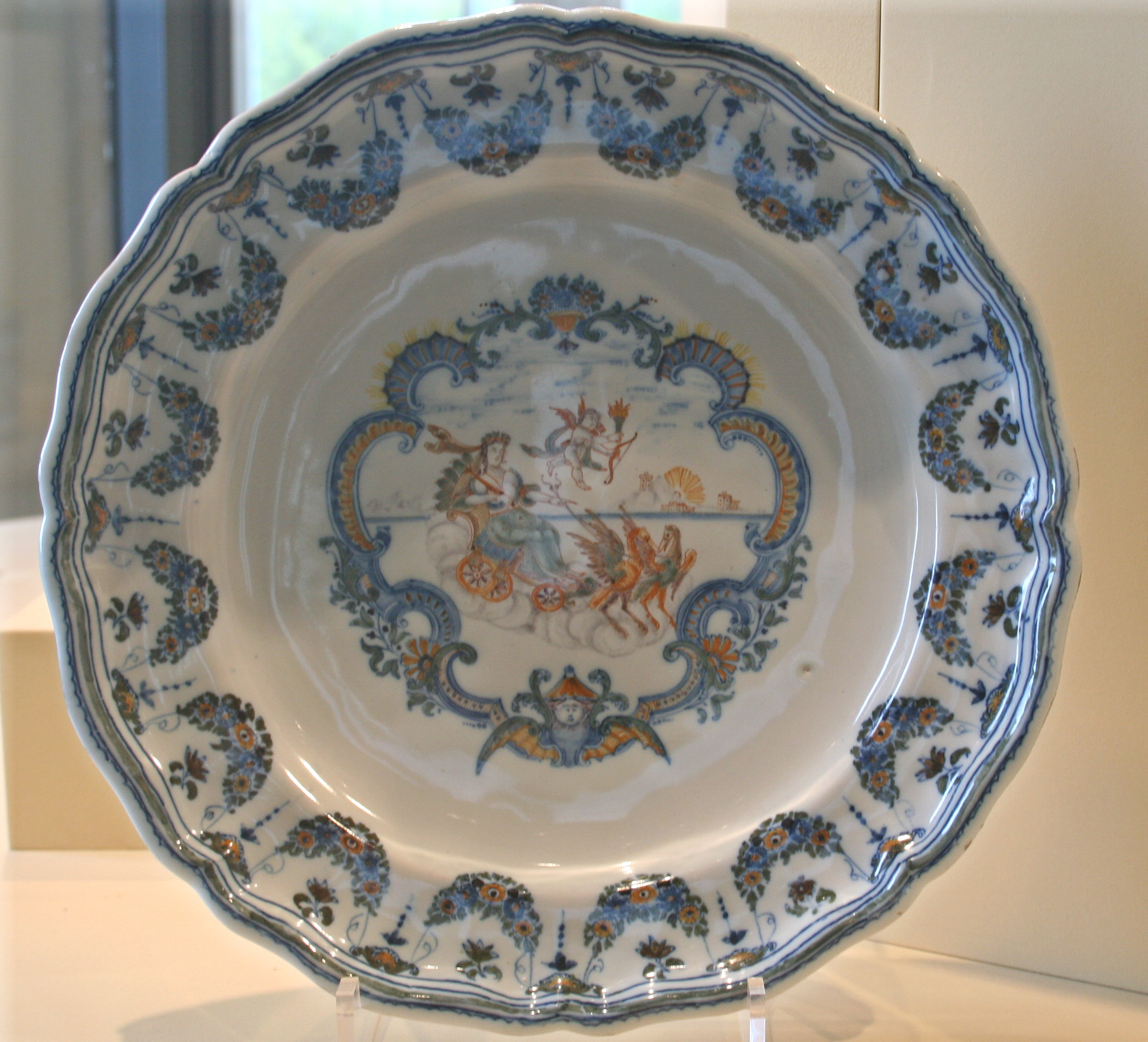
Completely plain cavetto

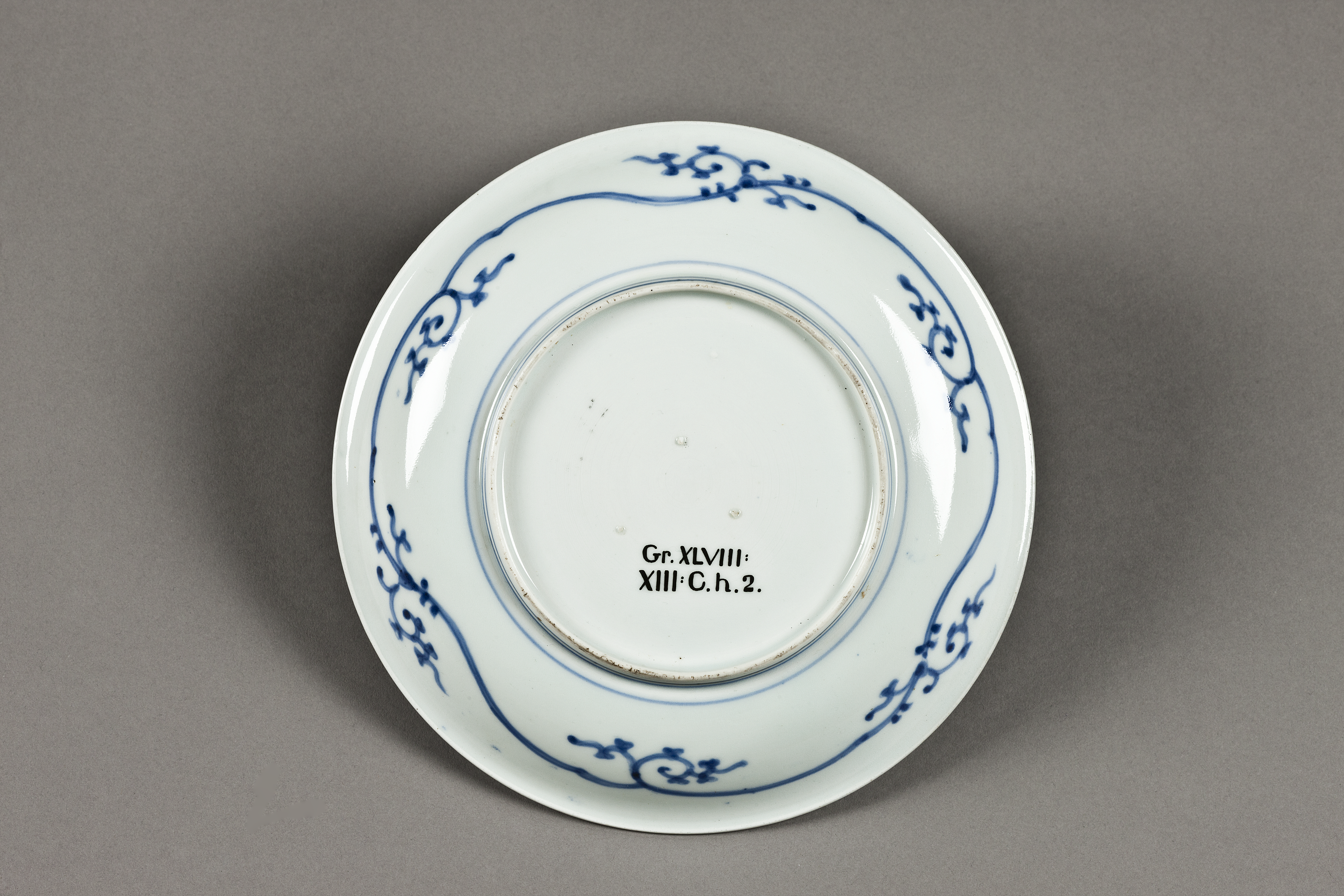
Upturned Japanese bowl with a decorated under-cavetto.

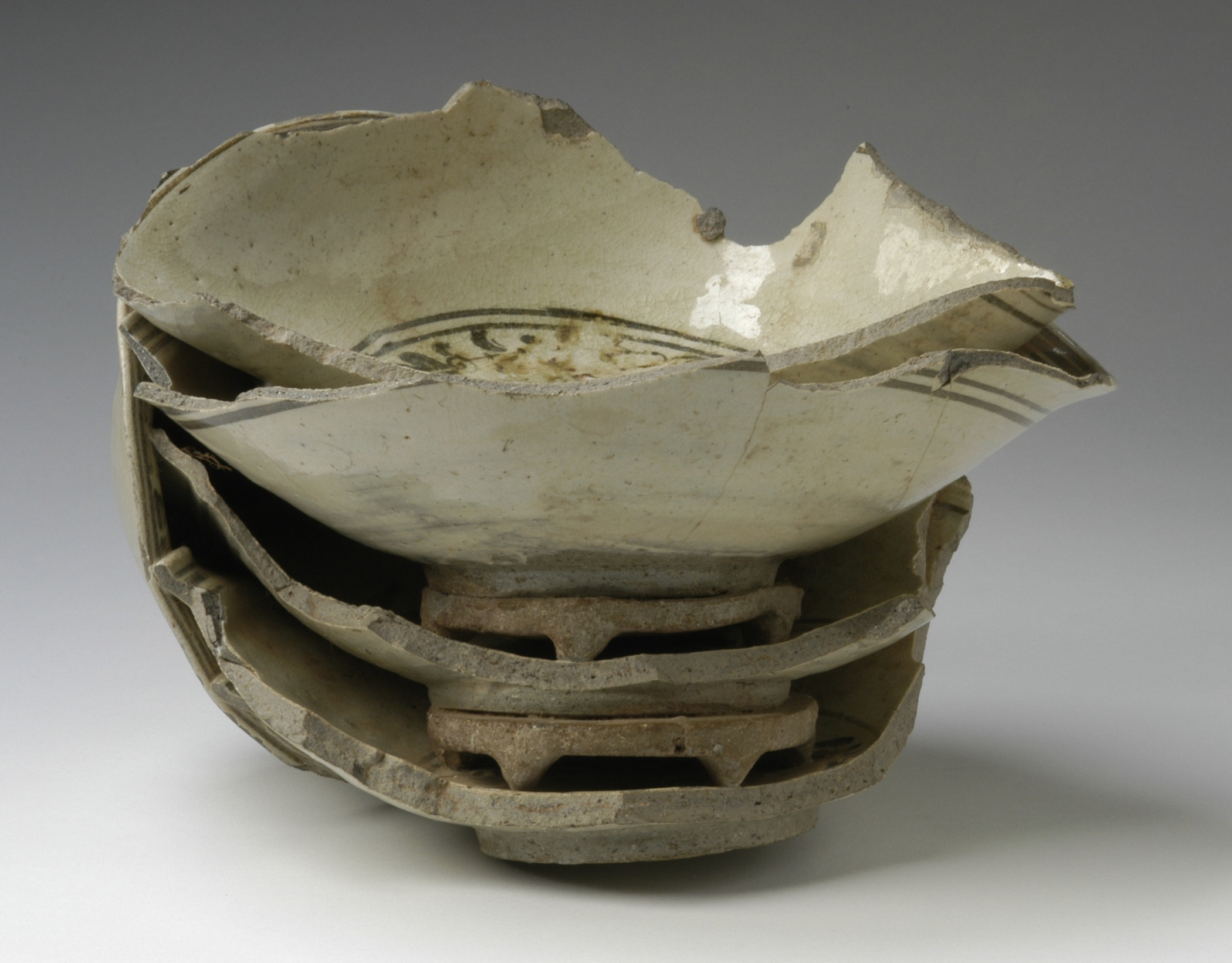
Waster bowls; the profile of the cavetto can be seen at lower left.

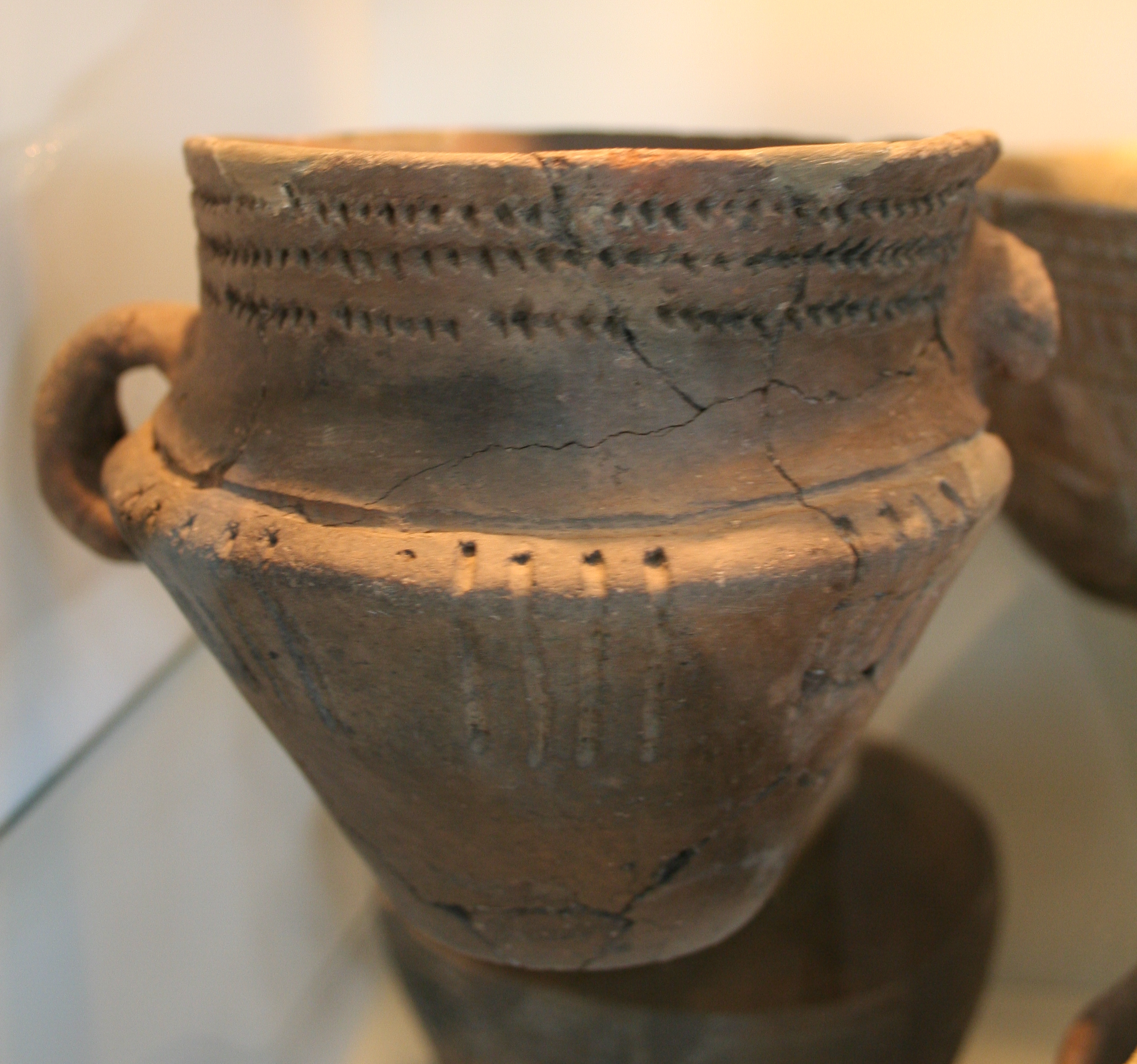
Cavetto zone, with three rows of indentations in the upper part, on a Neolithic German pot.

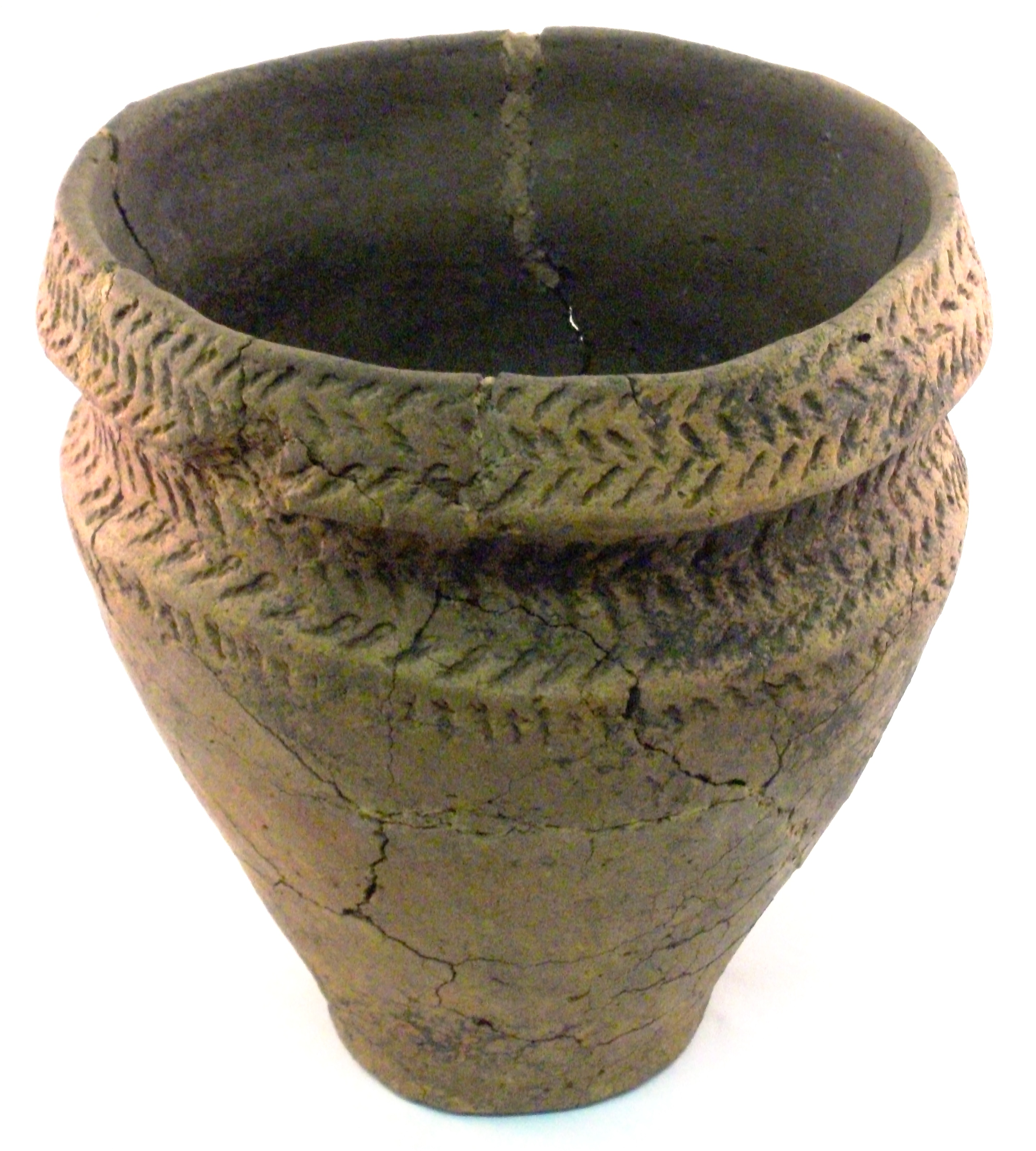
Bronze Age cremation urn, with cavetto, British

== See also ==
- Cymatium
