= November 26 (Eastern Orthodox liturgics) =

Day in the Eastern Orthodox liturgical calendar

Eastern Orthodox liturgical calendar
November 25	November 26	November 27
November 26 O.S. ≍ December 9 N.S. November 26 N.S ≍ November 13 O.S.

An Eastern Orthodox cross

November 26 in Eastern Orthodox liturgical calendars is a feast day and a day of commemoration of saints and martyrs. Although some Orthodox churches use the Revised Julian Calendar and others use the traditional Julian calendar, the fixed commemorations for their respective November 26 are broadly the same, no matter which calendar is used. (Note: Despite the dates being the same, the days to which they refer typically differ by 13 days. The notation Old Style or O.S. is sometimes used to indicate a date in the traditional Julian Calendar (the "Old Calendar"). The notation New Style or N.S. indicates a date in the Revised Julian calendar (the "New Calendar").)

== Saints ==
- Venerable James the Solitary of Syria (457)
- Venerable Chaeremon (Note: He is not recorded in the Menaia and Synaxarion of St. Nicodemus. However he is referenced in the Parisian Codex on this day, which notes that he lived an ascetical life in the desert and reposed in peace.)
- Saint Peter, Patriarch of Jerusalem (544 or 552) (Note: He is unknown in the Synaxarion. His memory is preserved in the Jerusalemitic Codex, p. 119, published by Archimandrite Kallistos.)
- Venerable Stylianos of Paphlagonia, monk (6th century) (Note: Name days celebrated today include: Stylianos, Stelios (Στυλιανός); Styliani, Stella (Στυλιανή).)
- Venerable Acacius of Mt. Latros, who is mentioned in The Ladder (6th century) (see also: November 29)
- Venerable Silas, Bishop of Corinth in Persia (Persidos)
- Saint Procopius of Persia (Note: He is unknown in the Synaxaria and the Menaia. His service is preserved in the Parisian Codex, where we learn that he fought against idolatry and suffered a martyric death after various and many tortures.)
- Venerable Alypius the Stylite of Adrianopolis (608 or 640)
- Venerable Nikon the Metanoeite of Armenia, "Preacher of Repentance" (988) (Note: Patron saint of Sparta and the region of the Mani Peninsula (southern part of Ancient Sparta) where he brought Christianity to Mani and preached it to the Maniots.)

== Pre-Schism Western saints ==
- Saint Amator, Bishop of Autun in France (3rd century)
- Saint Siricius, Pope of Rome (399) (Note: "At Rome, St. Siricius, pope and confessor, celebrated for his learning, piety and zeal for religion, who condemned various heretics, and published salutary laws concerning ecclesiastical discipline.")
- Saint Basolus (Basle), a French Benedictine monk at Verzy near Rheims, then a hermit for forty years on a hill near the city, confessor, wonderworker (c. 620)
- Saint Martin of Arades, a monk at Corbie Abbey in France (726)
- Saint Conrad of Constance, Bishop of Constance in Germany, went on pilgrimage to the Holy Land three times (975)
- Saint Vacz, a hermit in Visegrád in the mountains of Pilis in Hungary (11th century)

== Post-Schism Orthodox saints ==
- Venerables Athanasius and Theodosius of Cherepovets Monastery, Vologda, disciples of Saint Sergius of Radonezh (c. 1388)
- Saint Innocent, first bishop of Irkutsk, Apostle to Siberia and Wonderworker (1731)
- New Martyr George of Chios, at Kydonias in Asia Minor (1807)

=== New martyrs and confessors ===
- New Hieromartyrs Nicholas Zamaraev, John Vinogradov, George Kolokolov, Priests (1937)
- New Hieromartyrs Nazarius Gribkov, Basil Agafonikov, Basil Kolosov, Elijah Zachatesky, (Note: See also: (in Russian) Зачатейский, Илья Александрович. Википедии. (Russian Wikipedia).) Basil Studnitsyn, Daniel Meshaninov, (Note: See: (in Russian) Мещанинов, Даниил Федотович. Википедии. (Russian Wikipedia).) and Michael Zelentsovsky, Priests (1937)
- New Hieromartyr Tikhon Buzov, Archimandrite, of Donskoy Monastery, Moscow (1937)
- New Hieromartyr Peter Tsarapkin (after 1937)

== Other commemorations ==
- Dedication of the Church of St. George at Kiev (1054)
- Dedication of the Church of St. George in the Kyparission (Kyparissia) district of Constantinople (Note: This church was perhaps associated with Michael Attaleiates (1077 AD), because his family tomb was located there. The consecration of the church took place on April 24.)
- Repose of Sophianos of Dryinoupolis, Orthodox missionary in Ottoman Epirus, considered the forerunner of Kosmas the Aetolian in the region (1711)

== Icon gallery ==
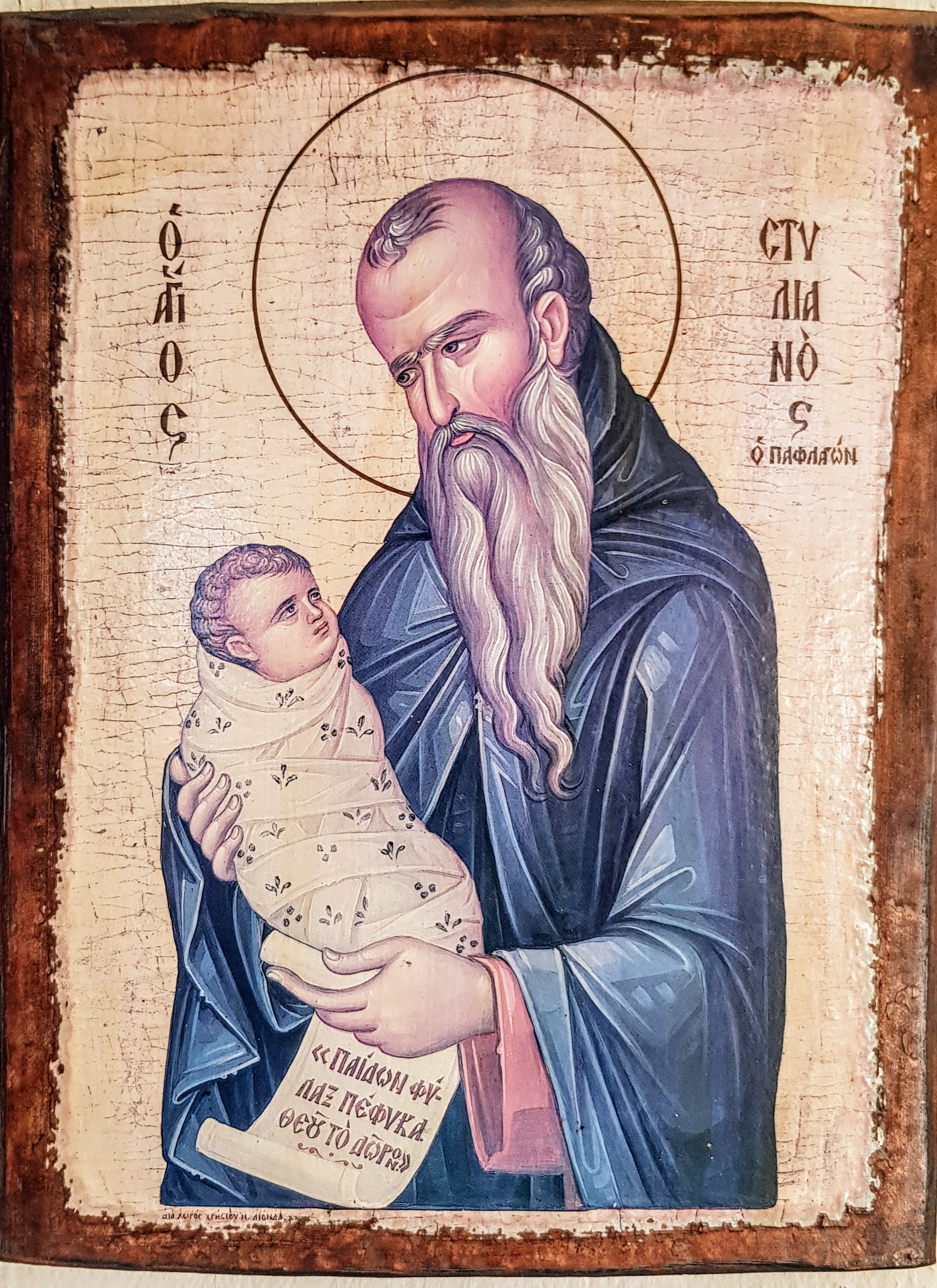
St. Stylianos of Paphlagonia.
The scroll reads:
I am by nature the guardian of children, but this gift is from God.

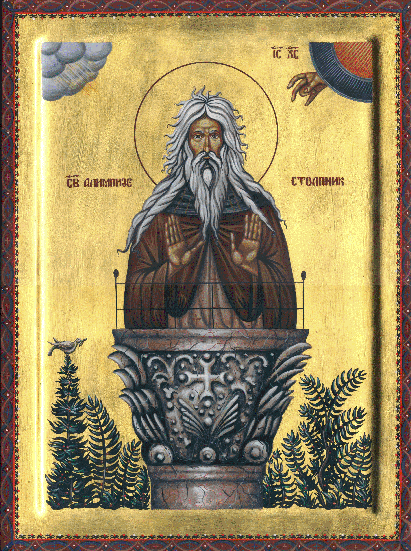
St. Alypius the Stylite of Adrianopolis.

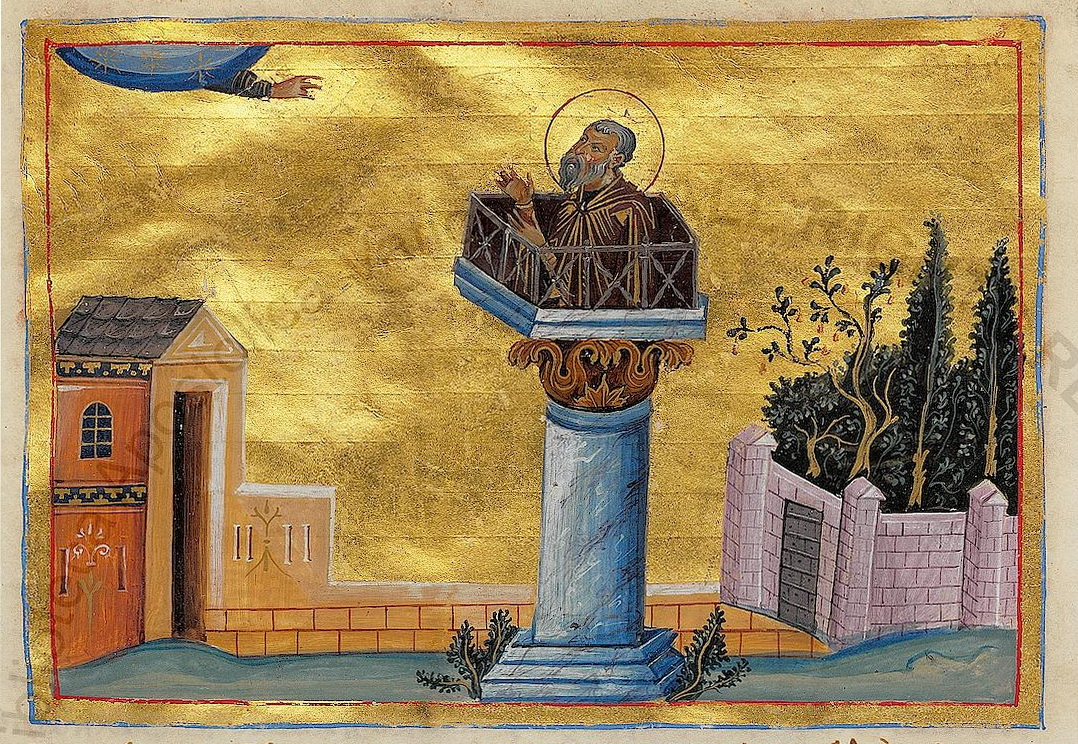
St. Alypius the Stylite of Adrianopolis.
(Menologion of Basil II, 10th century).

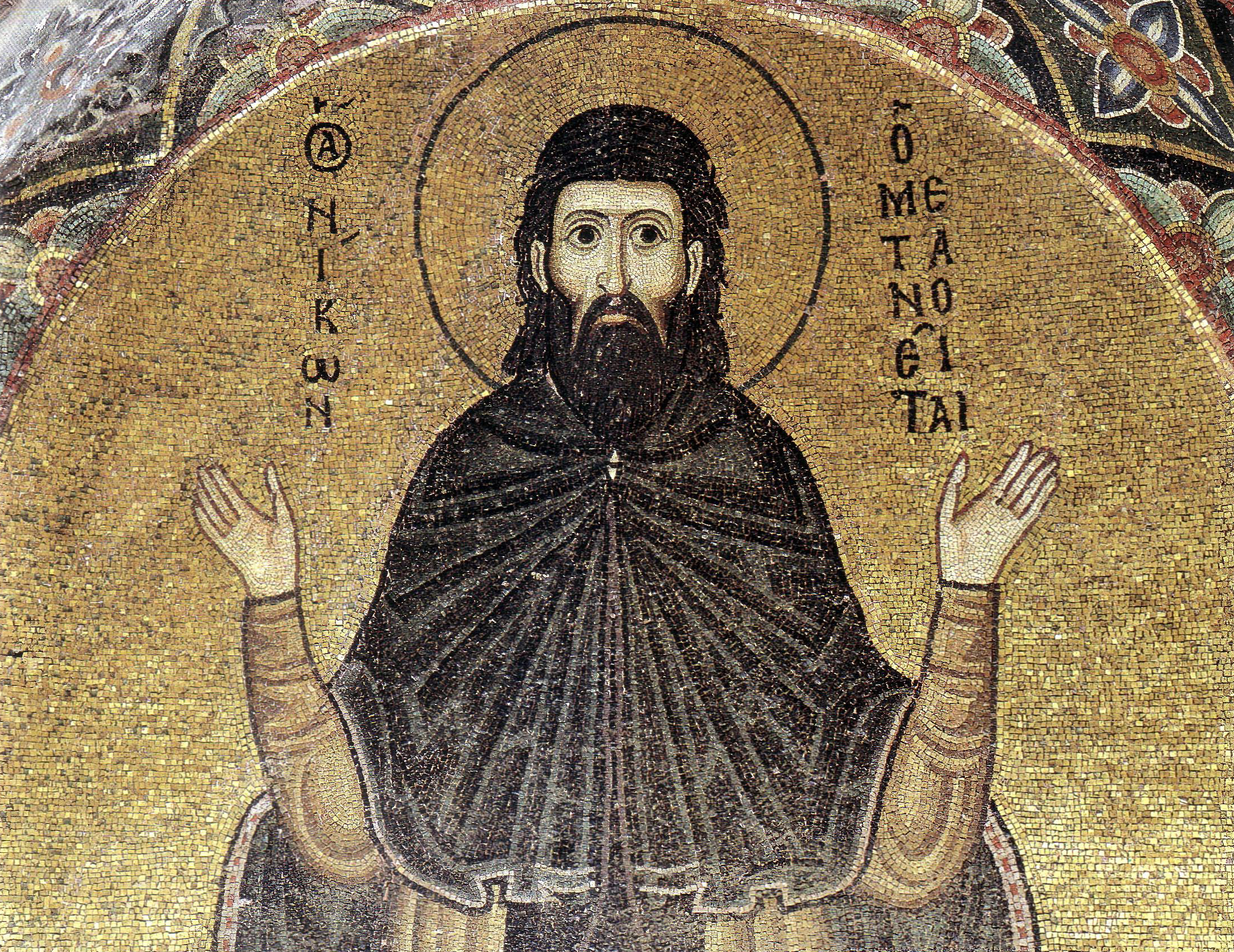
Venerable Nikon Metanoeite, "Preacher of Repentance".
(From Hosios Loukas).

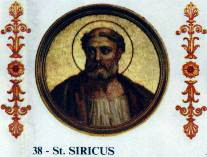
St. Siricius, Pope of Rome.

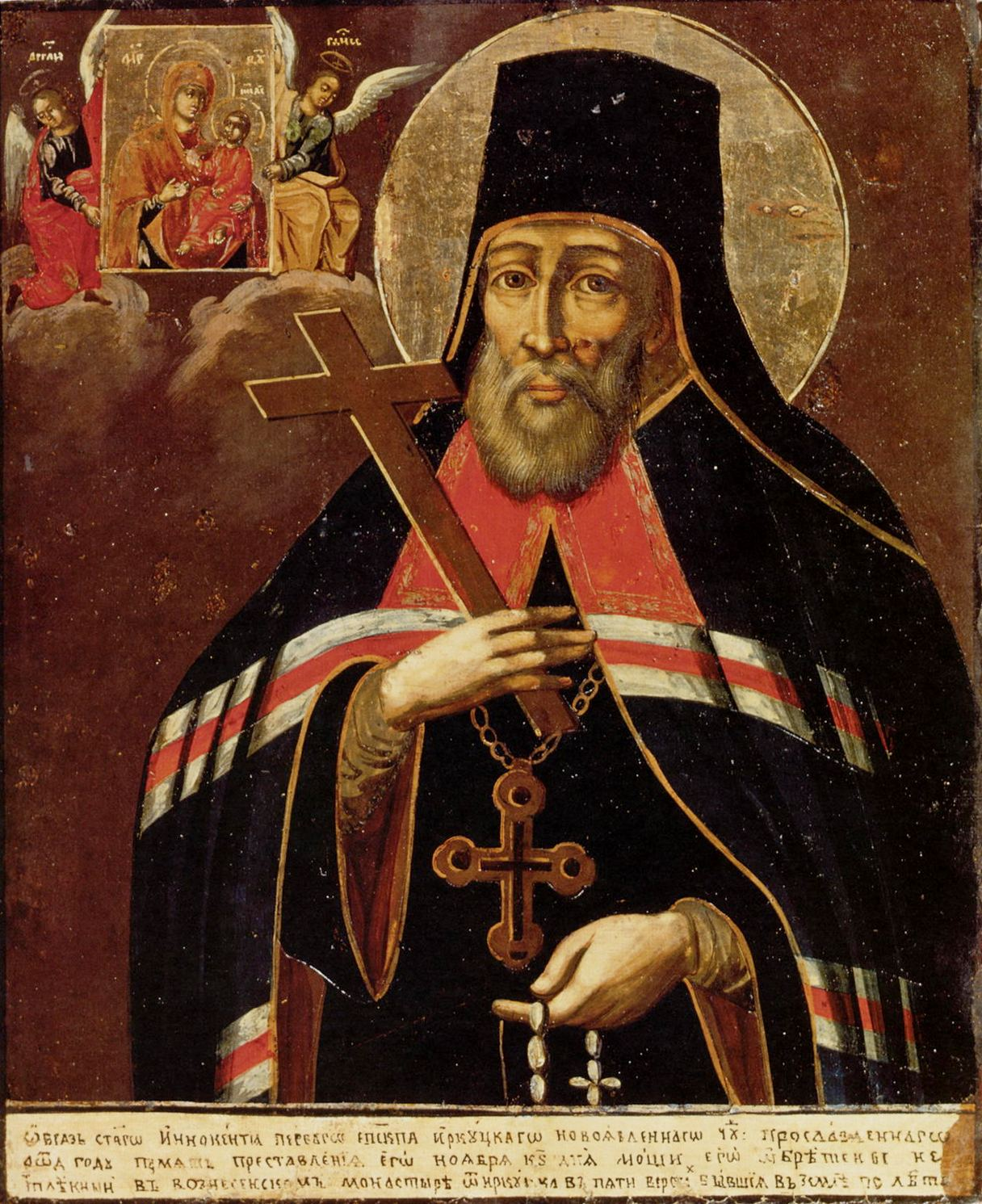
St. Innocent of Irkutsk, Apostle to Siberia.

== Sources ==
- November 26 / December 9. Orthodox Calendar (PRAVOSLAVIE.RU).
- December 9 / November 26. Holy Trinity Russian Orthodox Church (A parish of the Patriarchate of Moscow).
- November 26. OCA - The Lives of the Saints.
- The Autonomous Orthodox Metropolia of Western Europe and the Americas (ROCOR). St. Hilarion Calendar of Saints for the year of our Lord 2004. St. Hilarion Press (Austin, TX). p. 88.
- The Twenty-Sixth Day of the Month of November. Orthodoxy in China.
- November 26. Latin Saints of the Orthodox Patriarchate of Rome.
- The Roman Martyrology. Transl. by the Archbishop of Baltimore. Last Edition, According to the Copy Printed at Rome in 1914. Revised Edition, with the Imprimatur of His Eminence Cardinal Gibbons. Baltimore: John Murphy Company, 1916. pp. 364-365.
- Rev. Richard Stanton. A Menology of England and Wales, or, Brief Memorials of the Ancient British and English Saints Arranged According to the Calendar, Together with the Martyrs of the 16th and 17th Centuries. London: Burns & Oates, 1892. pp. 566–567.

Greek Sources

- Great Synaxaristes: (in Greek) 26 ΝΟΕΜΒΡΙΟΥ. ΜΕΓΑΣ ΣΥΝΑΞΑΡΙΣΤΗΣ.
- (in Greek) Συναξαριστής. 26 Νοεμβρίου. ECCLESIA.GR. (H ΕΚΚΛΗΣΙΑ ΤΗΣ ΕΛΛΑΔΟΣ).
- (in Greek) November 26. Ορθόδοξος Συναξαριστής.

Russian Sources

- (in Russian) 9 декабря (26 ноября). Православная Энциклопедия под редакцией Патриарха Московского и всея Руси Кирилла (электронная версия). (Orthodox Encyclopedia - Pravenc.ru).
- (in Russian) 26 ноября по старому стилю / 9 декабря по новому стилю. Русская Православная Церковь - Православный церковный календарь на 2018 год.
