= Stylianos of Paphlagonia =

5th-century cleric venerated as a saint in Eastern Orthodox Christianity

Saint Stylian of Paphlagonia
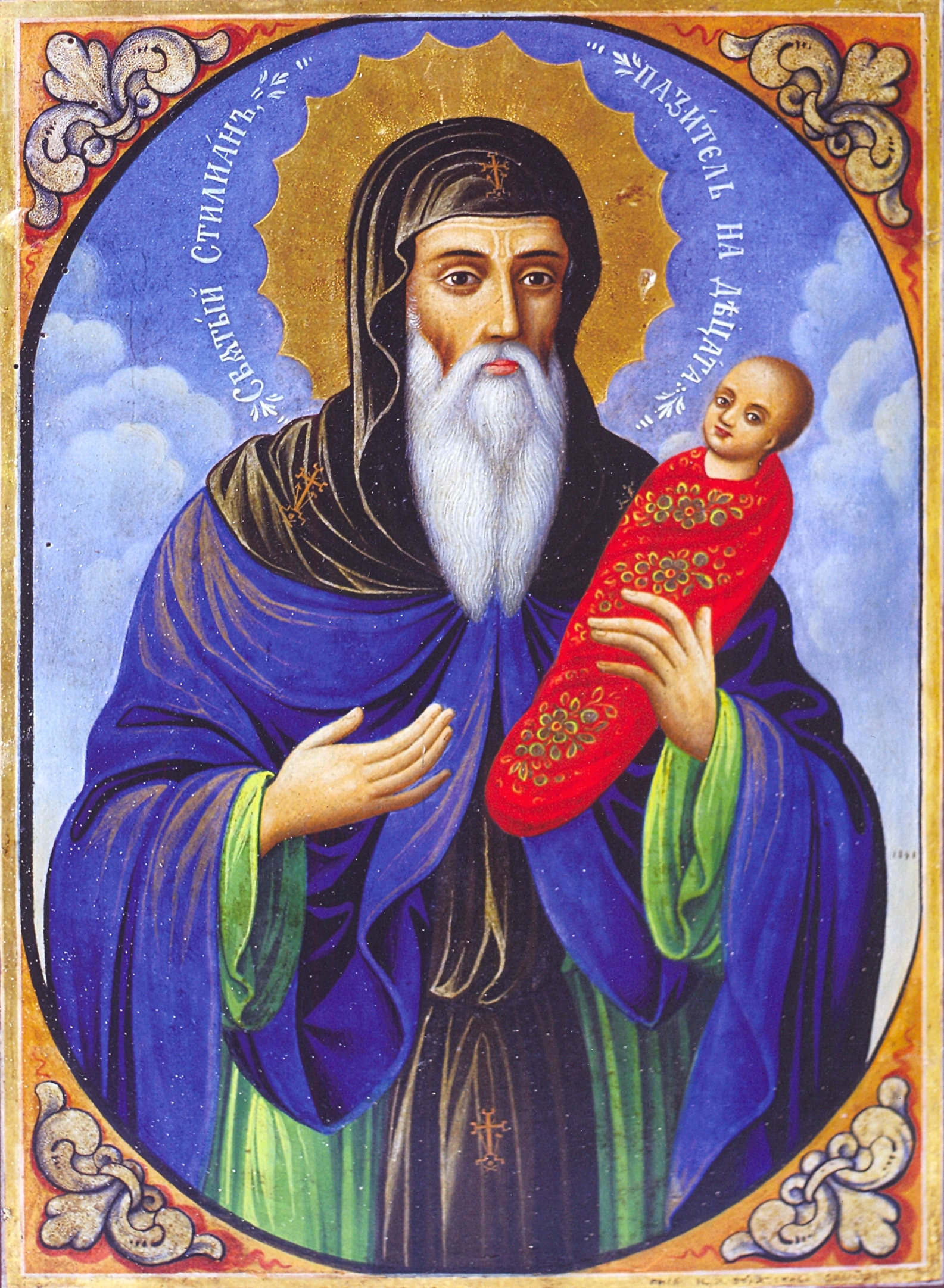
- Icon of Stylian
- Born: 5th century Adrianopolis (modern-day Eskipazar, Karabük, Turkey)
- Venerated in: Eastern Orthodox Church; Roman Catholic Church; Eastern Catholic Church
- Feast: November 26
- Attributes: Infant in arms
- Patronage: Children; Barren women

Stylian of Paphlagonia (Latin: Stylianus, Greek: Στυλιανός), also known as Stylian the Hermit or alternatively spelled Stylianos, is venerated as a saint from Adrianopolis in the province of Paphlagonia (modern Turkey).

== Life ==
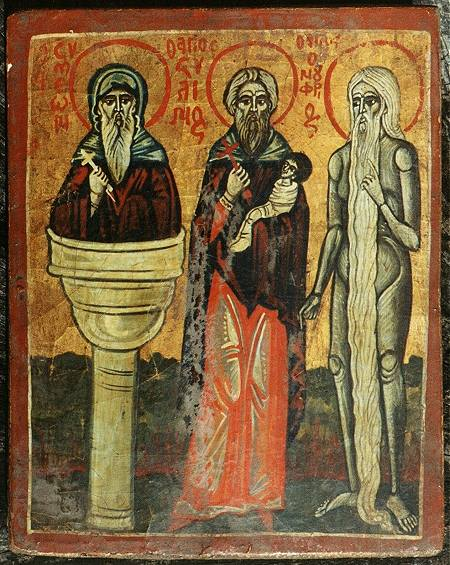
Simeon Stylites, Stylianos and Onuphrius

Stylian of Paphlagonia was born in Adrianopolis sometime between AD 400 and 500. He distributed his inheritance among the poor and left the city to live in a monastery. His zealous devotion and asceticism provoked jealousy on the part of other monks, so he left the monastery to live as a hermit in a cave in the wilderness, where he spent his time in prayer and fasting. There, in the peace of the desert, Stylianos had time to observe creation and meditate upon it, and he saw the Creator in all things. His holiness was evident to the people of the surrounding area, and they came to listen to his teaching, or to be cured through his prayers. He knew how to calm troubled souls; other ascetics came to join him.

Stylian is known for his smiling countenance and cheerful disposition. He would periodically leave his hermitage and make pastoral visits to neighboring villages.

Stylian was also known for his love of children. He believed that for a person to be saved, they needed to have their soul like that of a little child. Sometimes parents would leave their children with him for a period of time in order for them to receive some spiritual guidance.

He is celebrated for his gift of healing children by his prayers. Parents would travel great distances seeking a cure for their offspring, which Stylian attributed to the holy name of God. He also acquired the reputation of a wonder-worker because his prayers seemed to help childless couples have a child.

Even after his death, the people of Paphlagonia believed that he could cure their children. Whenever a child became sick, an icon of Saint Stylian was painted and hung over the child's bed.

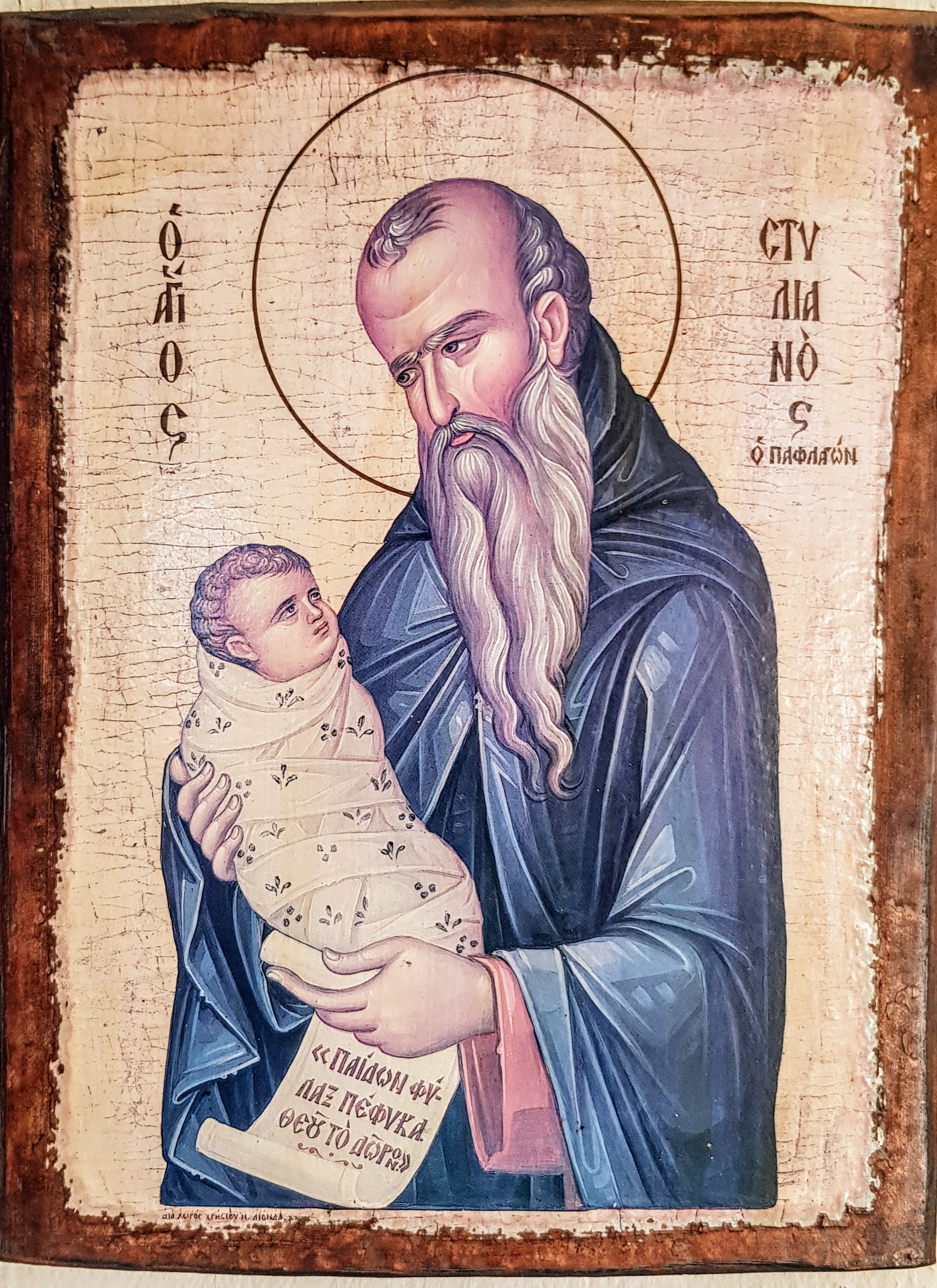
ΠΑΙΔΩΝ ΦΥΛΑΞ ΠΕΦΥΚΑ [ΑΛΛΑ] ΘΕΟΥ ΤΟ ΔΩΡΟΝ - I am by nature the guardian of children, but this gift is from God.

== Veneration ==
Saint Stylian is commemorated on 26 November.

=== Patronage ===
Saint Stylian is known as a protector of children, especially orphans. Pious Christians invoke him to help and protect their children; childless women entreat his intercession so that they might have children.

=== Iconography ===
Saint Stylian is depicted in iconography holding a swaddled infant in his arms.

== Historicity ==
The general opinion of scholars is that Stylian was historical, though Bollandist Hippolyte Delehaye argued that Stylian never existed. He believed that Stylian was but was a confusion with Alypios the Stylite, who shares a saint's day and city of birth, with the attribute 'stylite' being confused with a cognomen Στυλιανός (both derived from στύλος 'pillar').

Delehaye's opinions on Stylian have been criticized as without merit. One source reports that Saint Stylian was "most likely a different person from St. Alypios of Hadrianopolis" due to "the notable distinctions between their respective lives and saintly deeds".

== Sources ==
- Poulos, The Rev. George, Orthodox Saints, Orthodox Press (1986)
