= Hadrianopolis in Paphlagonia =

Ancient Roman city in Paphlagonia

- Location within Turkey
- 40.9258°N 32.4913°E
- Type: Settlement
- Location: Karabük Province, Turkey
- Region: Paphlagonia

Hadrianopolis in Paphlagonia (Ancient Greek: Ἁδριανούπολις ἐν Παφλαγονίᾳ) was a city in southwestern Paphlagonia, Asia Minor (modern Turkey), about 3km west of modern Eskipazar.

It was inhabited at least from the 1st century BC to the 8th century AD. It was named after the Roman emperor Hadrian in the 2nd century AD. The city also bore the names of Caesarea or Kaisareia (Καισάρεια) and Proseilemmene.

== History ==
Hadrianapolis had settlements in the late Hellenistic, Roman and early Byzantine periods.

When Emperor Theodosius I (347–395) made parts of Paphlagonia and Bithynia into a new province called Honorias, Hadrianopolis became known as Hadrianopolis in Honoriade, the name by which the ancient episcopal see is known in the list of what are now titular sees included in the Annuario Pontificio.

It is known as the birthplace of Saints Alypios the Stylite and Stylianos of Paphlagonia.

== Excavations ==
Excavations started in 2003. Archaeological surface surveys have uncovered 14 public buildings and other structures in the ancient city. Among these public buildings are two baths, two churches, a defense structure, rock tombs, a theater, an arched and domed structure, a monumental cultic niche, walls, a villa, other monumental buildings and some religious buildings. The church floors are decorated with mosaics and have images of the rivers of Gihon, Pishon, Tigris and Euphrates imprinted on them, which are mentioned in the Bible. Various animals are also depicted in the mosaics of the ancient city, which has been likened to the ancient city of Zeugma.

One of the earliest known churches in Anatolia was excavated in Hadrianopolis. In December 2019, archaeologists unearthed an 1800-year-old limestone slab containing a female silhouette most likely depicts Demeter. According to the archaeologist Ersin Çelikbaş, there was an inscription on the surface of the slab- "Herakleides, the son of Glaukos". "The slab has a figure of a woman on it wearing a traditional dress, holding ears of wheat in her right hand and wearing a belt with a snake on her waist. Most probably, this is the goddess of the harvest and agriculture Demeter" said Ersin Çelikbaş.

In 2022 new mosaics with polychrome peacock and amphora figures with grape basket decorations were found in a Roman fort. Geophysical and other surveys have revealed 14 public buildings and other structures in the ancient city so far.
