= Sadeyaka =

- Village
- Sadeyaka and its villages

- Location within Turkey
- Coordinates: 40°53′N 32°39′E
- Country: Turkey
- Province: Karabük
- District: Eskipazar
- Elevation: 1,040 m (3,410 ft)
- Population (2022): 132
- Time zone: UTC+3 (TRT)

Sadeyaka is a village in Eskipazar District, Karabük Province, Turkey. Its population is 132 (2022). The hamlets Kısaç, Saraycık and Şeyhler (Şıhlar) are administratively part of Sadeyaka.

== History ==
Historical population
Year	Pop.	±% p.a.
1940	519	—
1950	653	+2.32%
1960	759	+1.52%
1965	711	−1.30%
1970	693	−0.51%
1980	521	−2.81%
1990	468	−1.07%
1997	313	−5.58%
2007	179	−5.43%
2012	160	−2.22%
2017	137	−3.06%
2022	132	−0.74%
Source: Population censuses (1940-1997) and TÜIK (2007-2022)

The earliest official records goes back to 1896, when the village is part of kaza of Çerkeş in sanjak of Çankırı in vilayet of Kastamonu. The village was administered by Çerkeş, Çankırı until 1945, when Eskipazar became a district. When Karabük became a province in 1995, the village became part of Karabük along with Eskipazar. Drinking water infrastructe has been completed in 2008.

== Culture ==
It has local food such as cizleme, kaz bandırması and arpa-buğday gavurgası. Miyane helvası and nişasta helvası (White Helva) is a tradition on religious holidays. There is a türbe in Şeyhler village built for Sheikh Ali Semerkandi. His grave is in Çamlıdere, Ankara, but there is a water well called "Sığırcık Suyu" dedicated to him.

== Geography ==
Village center is 51 km away from Karabük, and 16 km from Eskipazar. It has oceanic climate.

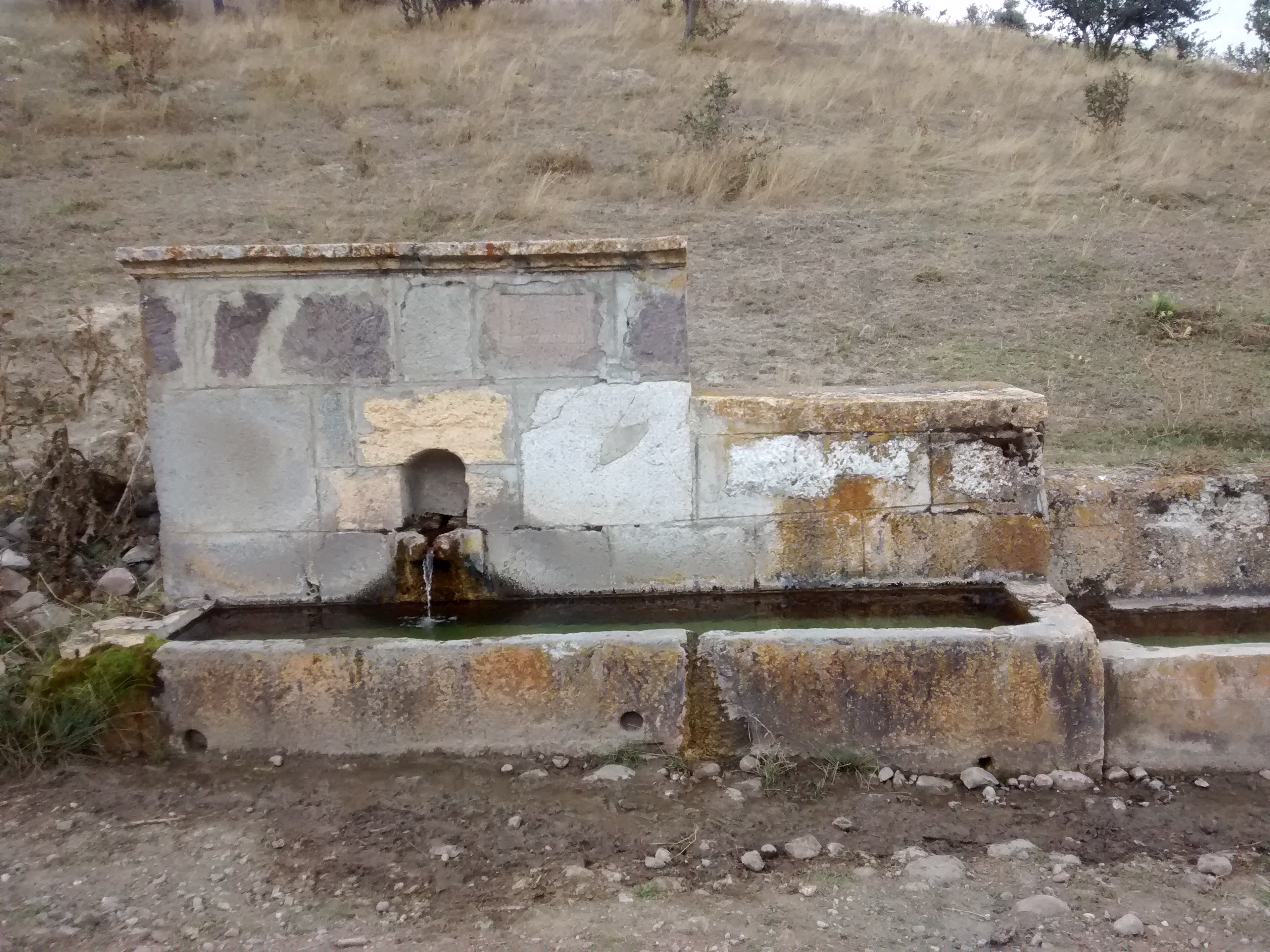
Üçoluk fountain near village, 2015

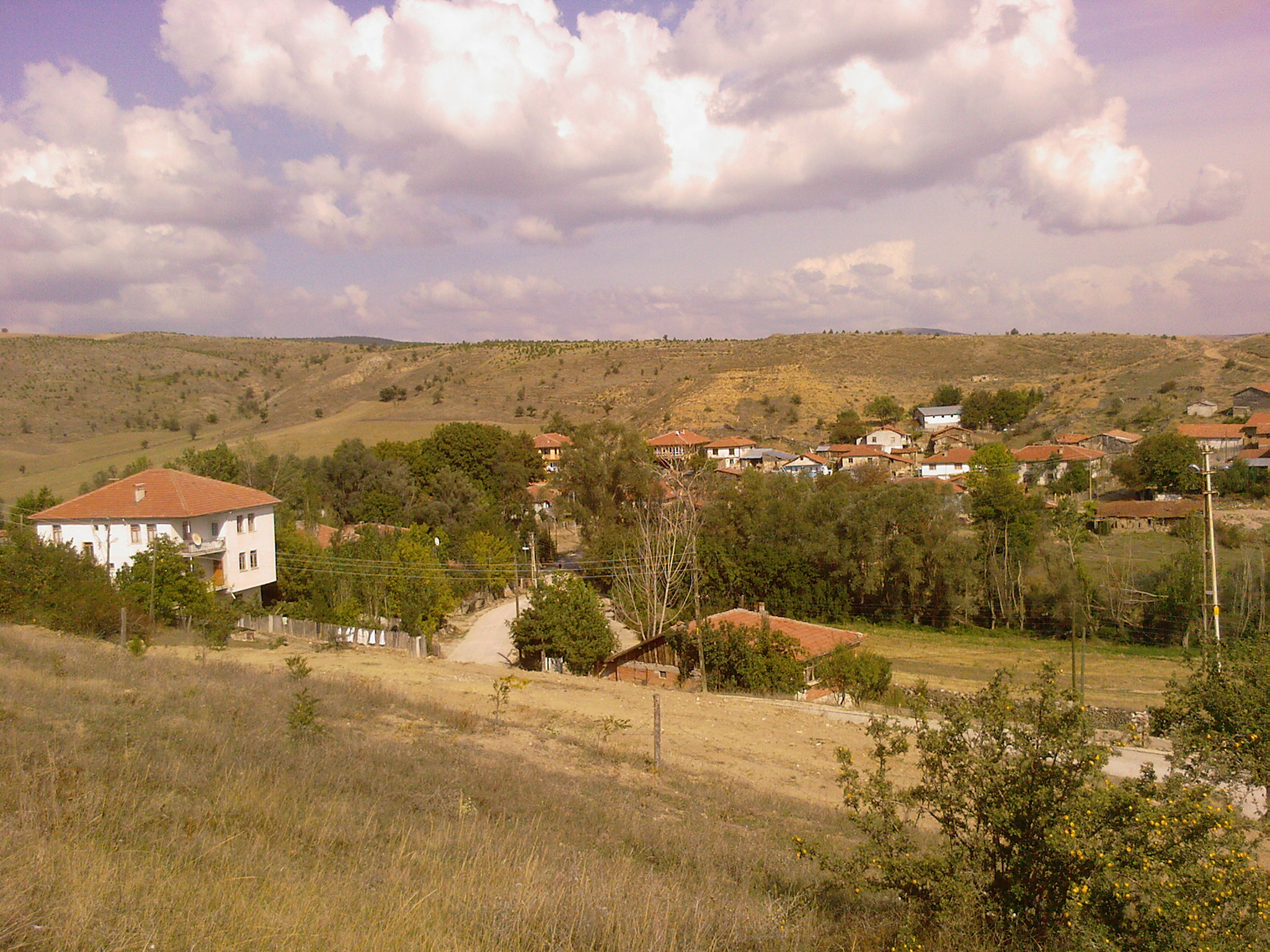
Sadeyaka in 2011

== Local governance ==
The muhtars with their election dates are:

2009: Rıza Akbaş
1999, 2004: Ali Demirtaş (2 terms)
1994: Hüsamettin Tepe
1989: Sadet Yazı
1984: Adil Akbaşoğlu
