= Eskipazar District =

District of Karabük Province, Turkey

- District
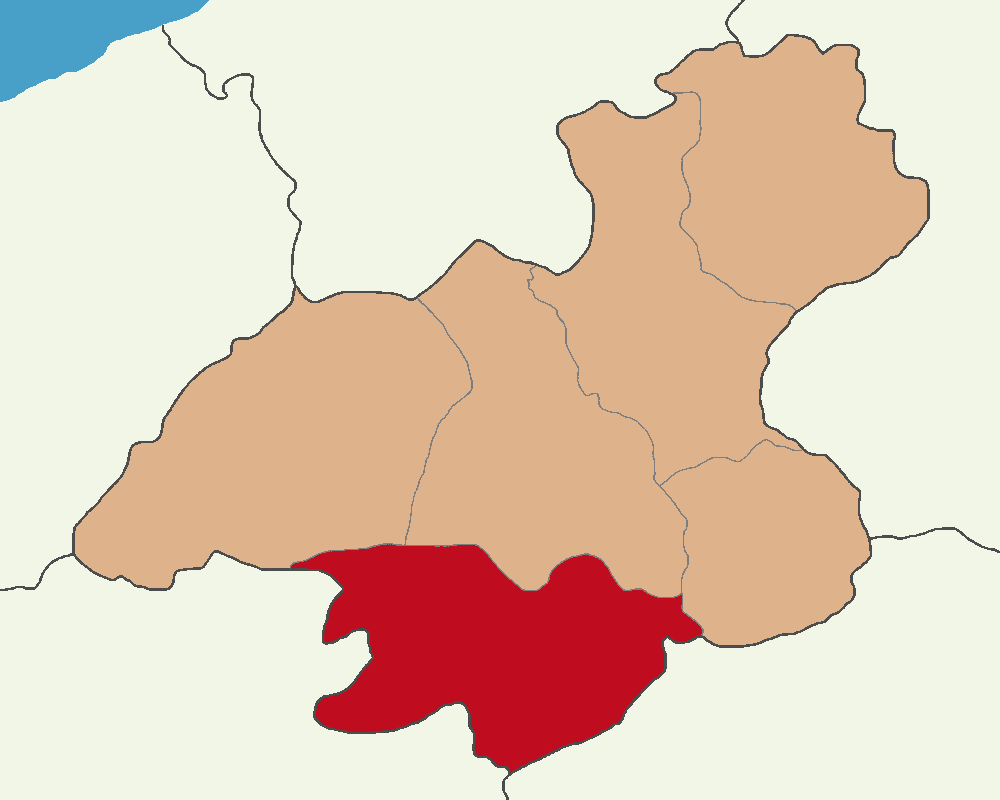
- Map showing Eskipazar District in Karabük Province

- Location in Turkey
- Coordinates: 40°57′N 32°32′E
- Country: Turkey
- Province: Karabük
- Seat: Eskipazar

Government
  - Kaymakam: Gizem Tokur
- Area: 754 km^{2} (291 sq mi)
- Population (2022): 12,767
  - Density: 16.9/km^{2} (43.9/sq mi)
- Time zone: UTC+3 (TRT)
- Website: www.eskipazar.gov.tr

Eskipazar District is a district of the Karabük Province of Turkey. Its seat is the town of Eskipazar. Its area is 754 km^{2}, and its population is 12,767 (2022).

== Composition ==
There is one municipality in Eskipazar District:

- Eskipazar

There are 50 villages in Eskipazar District:

- Adiller
- Arslanlar
- Babalar
- Başpınar
- Bayındır
- Belen
- Beytarla
- Boncuklar
- Bölükören
- Budaklar
- Bulduk
- Büyükyayalar
- Çandırlar
- Çaylı
- Çömlekçiler
- Deresemail
- Deresoplan
- Doğancılar
- Doğlacık
- Gözlü
- Hamamlı
- Hamzalar
- Hanköy
- Hasanlar
- Haslı
- İmanlar
- İnceboğaz
- Kabaarmut
- Kapaklı
- Kapıcılar
- Karahasanlar
- Karaören
- Köyceğiz
- Kulat
- Kuzören
- Ortaköy
- Ovaköy
- Ozanköy
- Sadeyaka
- Sallar
- Şevkiler
- Sofular
- Söbüçimen
- Tamışlar
- Topçalı
- Üçevler
- Yazıboyu
- Yazıkavak
- Yeşiller
- Yürecik
