= Alypius the Stylite =

Christian saint (died 640)

Saint Alypius the Stylite
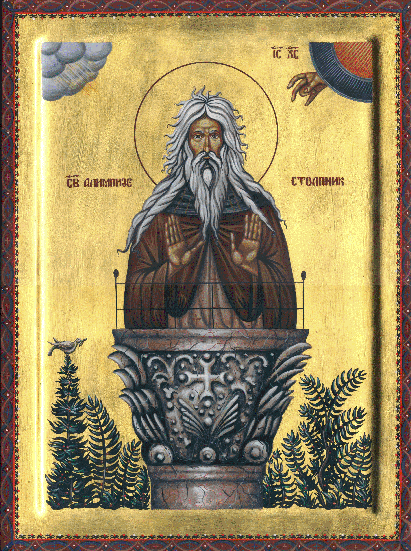
- Orthodox icon of Saint Alypius

Venerable Stylite
- Born: 522 (reputedly); Hadrianopolis, Paphlagonia (modern-day Eskipazar, Karabük, Turkey)
- Died: 640; Hadrianopolis (modern-day Eskipazar, Karabük, Turkey)
- Venerated in: Eastern Orthodox Church; Eastern Catholic Churches; Roman Catholic Church
- Feast: November 26
- Attributes: Clothed in his monastic habit, standing atop a pillar in orans
- Patronage: fertility in women, young children

Alypius the Stylite (Ancient Greek: Ἀλύπιος ὁ Στυλίτης) was a seventh-century ascetic saint. He is revered as a monastic founder, an intercessor for the infertile. During his lifetime he was a much sought-after starets (guide in the Christian spiritual life).

== Life ==
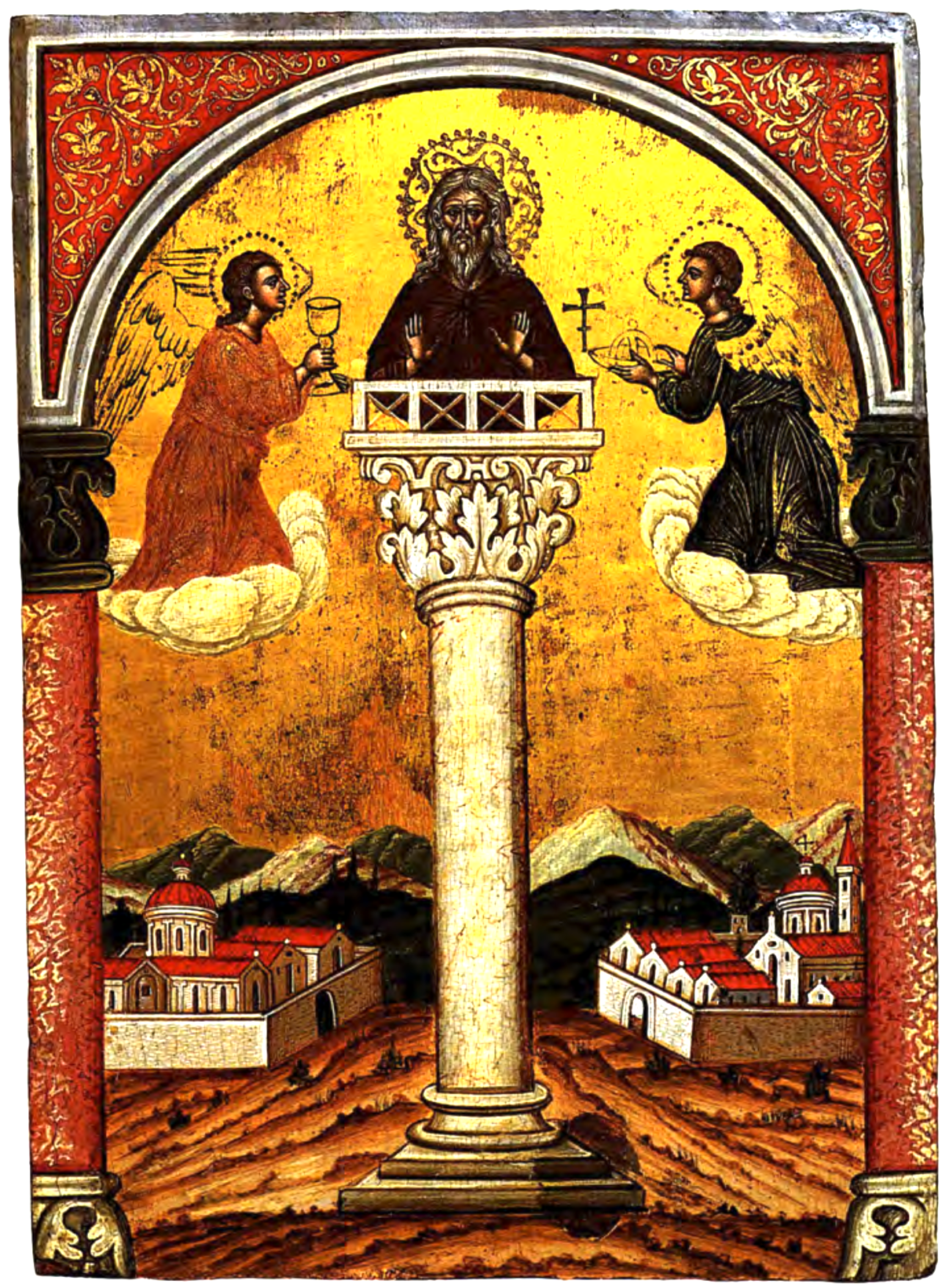
Alypius the Stylite by Emmanuel Tzanes

Alypius was born in the city of Hadrianopolis in Paphlagonia. His mother, who had been widowed early, was very pious. She sent her son to be educated by the bishop Theodore, gave all of her livelihood to the poor, and herself became a deaconess and lived an ascetic life.

Alypius yearned to practice the life of a hermit, but Bishop Theodore would not give him permission to do so. Alypius built a church in honour of the great martyr Euphemia on the site of a dilapidated pagan temple. He erected a pillar beside the church and lived atop it for the majority of his adult life. Two monasteries were built beside his pillar, one for monks and one for nuns, and Alypius served as spiritual director of both. It is claimed that, after standing upright for fifty-three years, Alypius found his feet no longer able to support him, but instead of descending from his pillar lay down on his side and spent the remaining fourteen years of his life in that position. Alypius died in 640, at the claimed age of 118.

== Veneration ==
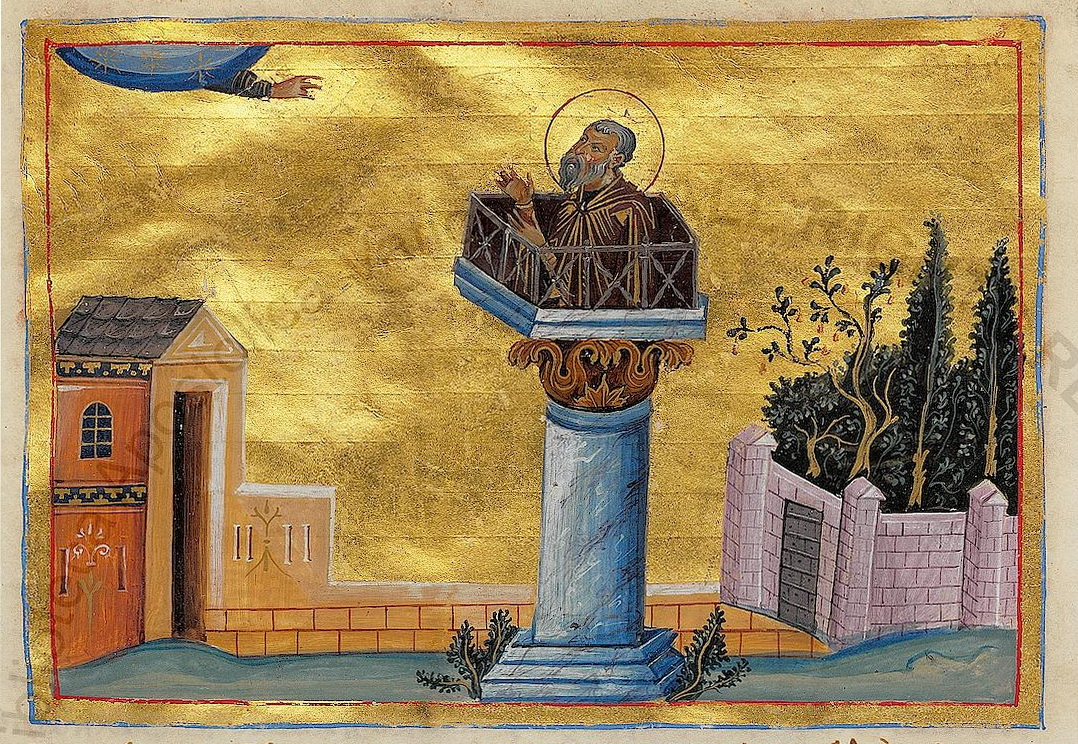
Alypius the Stylite depicted in the 11th century Menologion of Basil II.

Alypius is venerated in the Eastern Orthodox Church and those Eastern Catholic Churches which follow the Byzantine Rite, as well as the Roman Catholic Church on November 26. For those churches which follow the Julian Calendar November 26 currently falls on December 9 of the modern Gregorian Calendar. After his death his relics were interred in the Church of St. Euphemia which he had built. His head is preserved in the Monastery of Koutloumousiou on the Mount Athos.

Alypius is recognised as one of the three great stylite ascetics along with Simeon Stylites the Elder and Daniel the Stylite. Herbert Thurston says of the Stylites that they did, in an age of terrible corruption and social decadence, impress the need of penance more than anything else could have done upon the minds and imagination of Eastern Christians.

== See also ==
- Foolishness for Christ
- Hermit
- Poustinia
- Stylianos of Paphlagonia
