= Eskipazar =

- Municipality
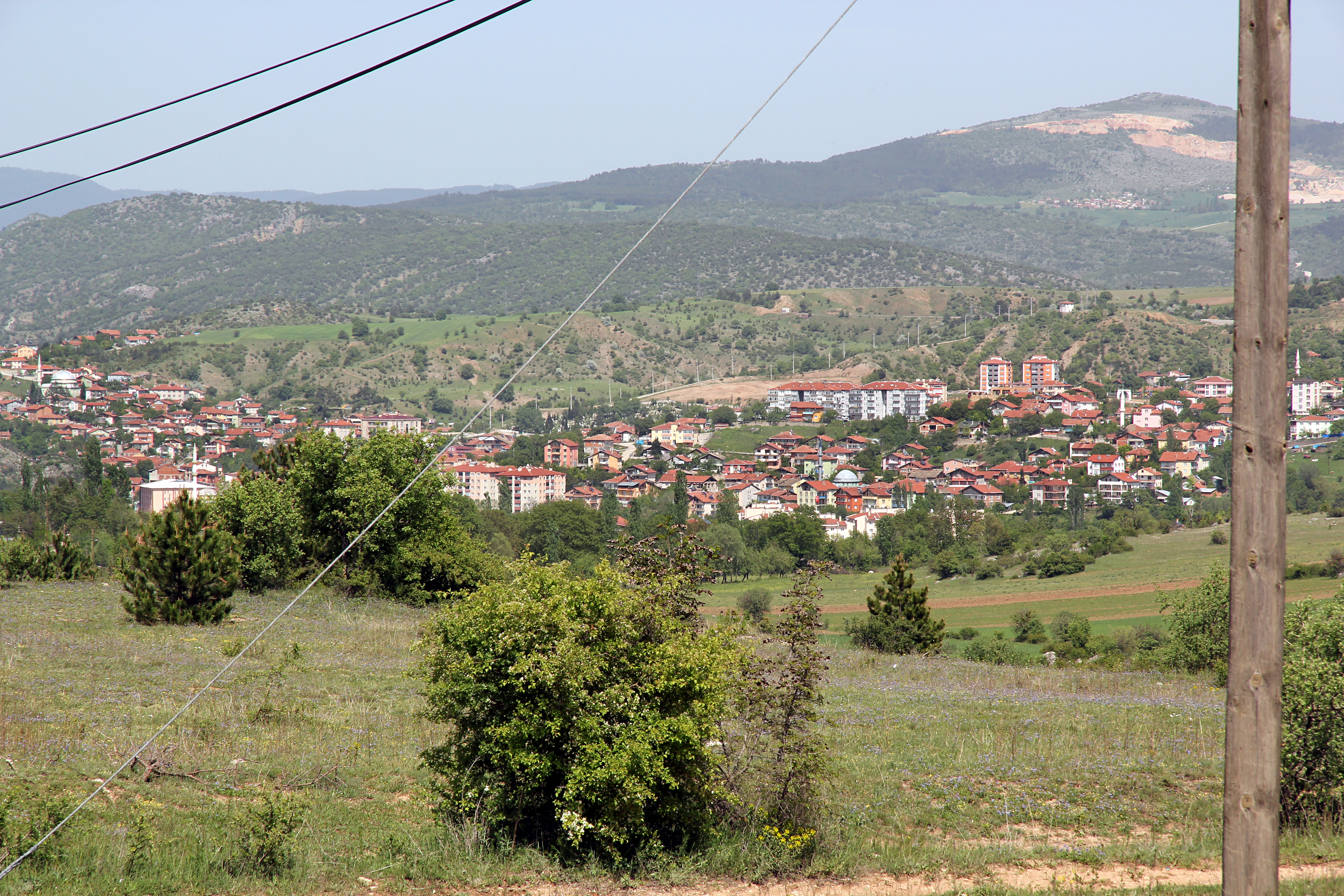

- Location within Turkey
- Coordinates: 40°56′35″N 32°31′50″E
- Country: Turkey
- Province: Karabük
- District: Eskipazar

Government
  - Mayor: Serkan Cıva (AKP)
- Elevation: 750 m (2,460 ft)
- Population (2022): 6,689
- Time zone: UTC+3 (TRT)
- Area code: 0370
- Climate: Cfb
- Website: www.eskipazar.bel.tr

Eskipazar is a town in Karabük Province in the Black Sea region of Turkey. It is the seat of Eskipazar District. Its population is 6,689 (2022). The town lies at an elevation of 750 m (2,461 ft). It separated from Çerkeş district to become a district in its own right in 1945. It was a district in Çankırı Province until 1995. The Ankara-Zonguldak railway passes through the district.

== History ==
The city was founded about 1300 BC by the Hittites. It became part of the Roman Empire in the 1st century BC, and its name was changed to Hadrianopolis (Greek: Ἁδριανούπολις), better known as Hadrianopolis in Paphlagonia, in the 2nd century AD.

The city was captured by Emir Karatekin, along with Çankırı, and named Viranşehir. The name was changed to Eskipazar during the Second Constitutional Era.

In 2018, during archaeological excavations discovered one of the earliest churches in Anatolia. According to a member of Karabük University's archaeology department it dates back to the mid-5th century.

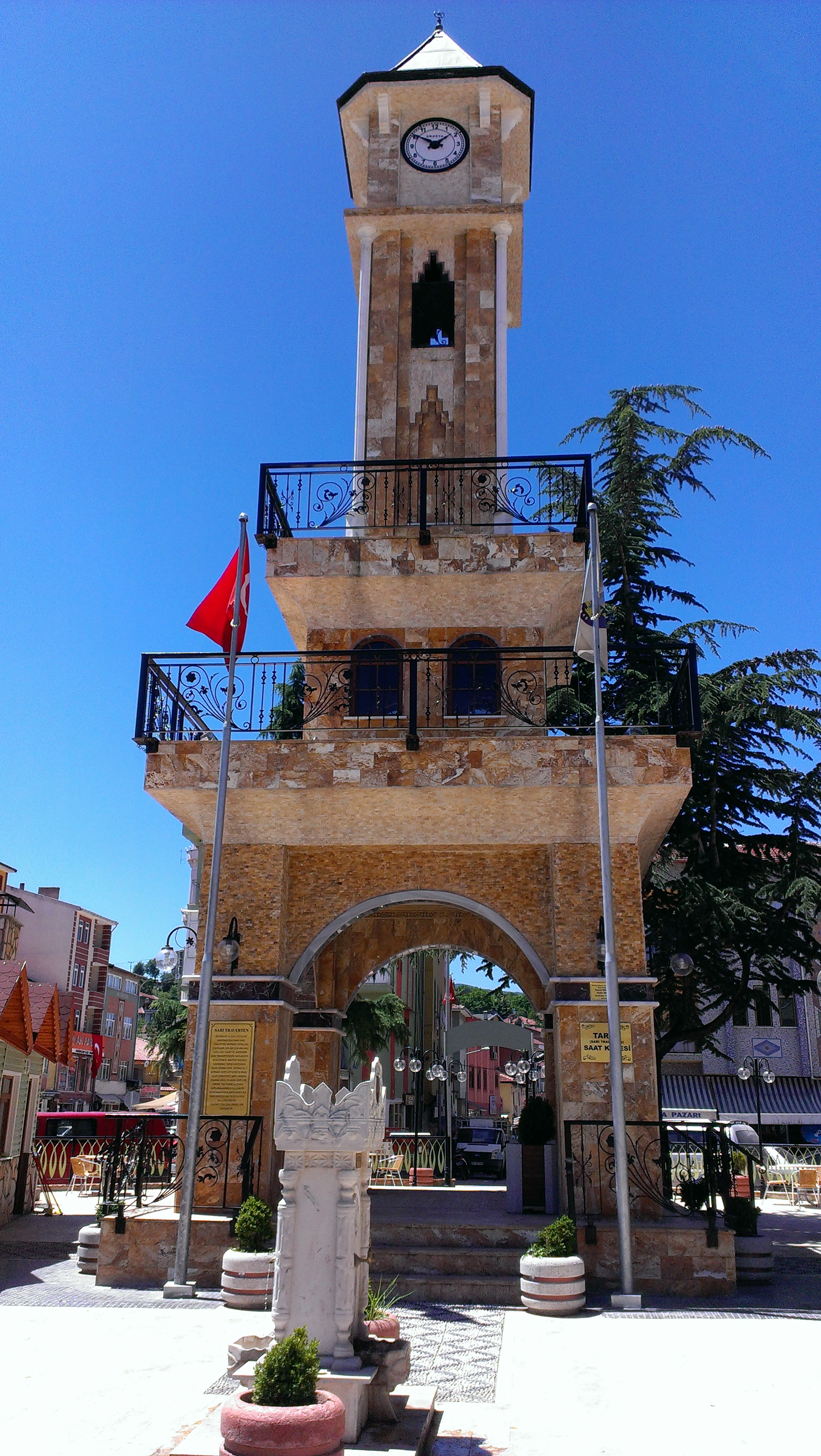
Eskipazar Clock Tower, 2013

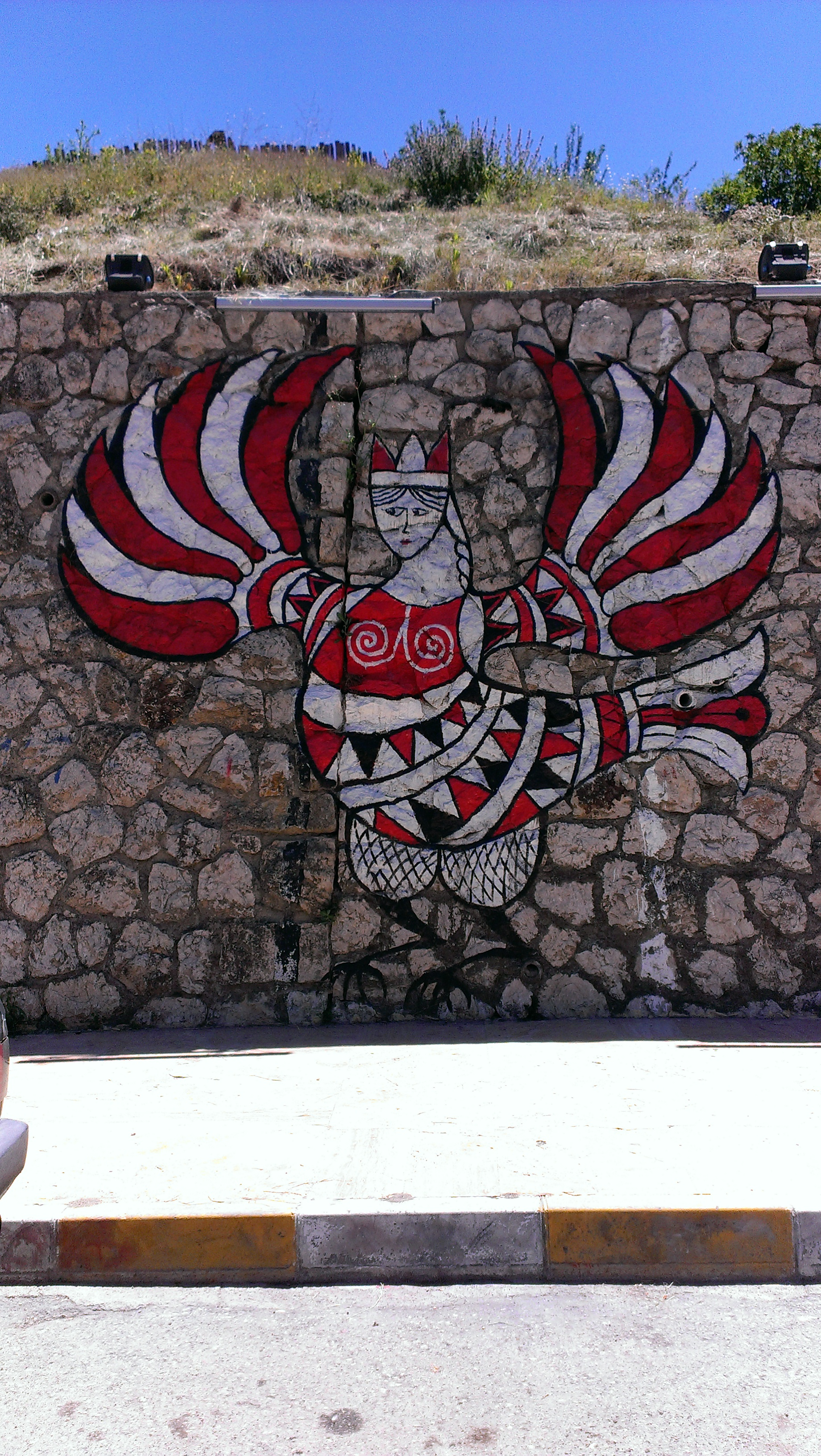
Street art in Eskipazar, 2013

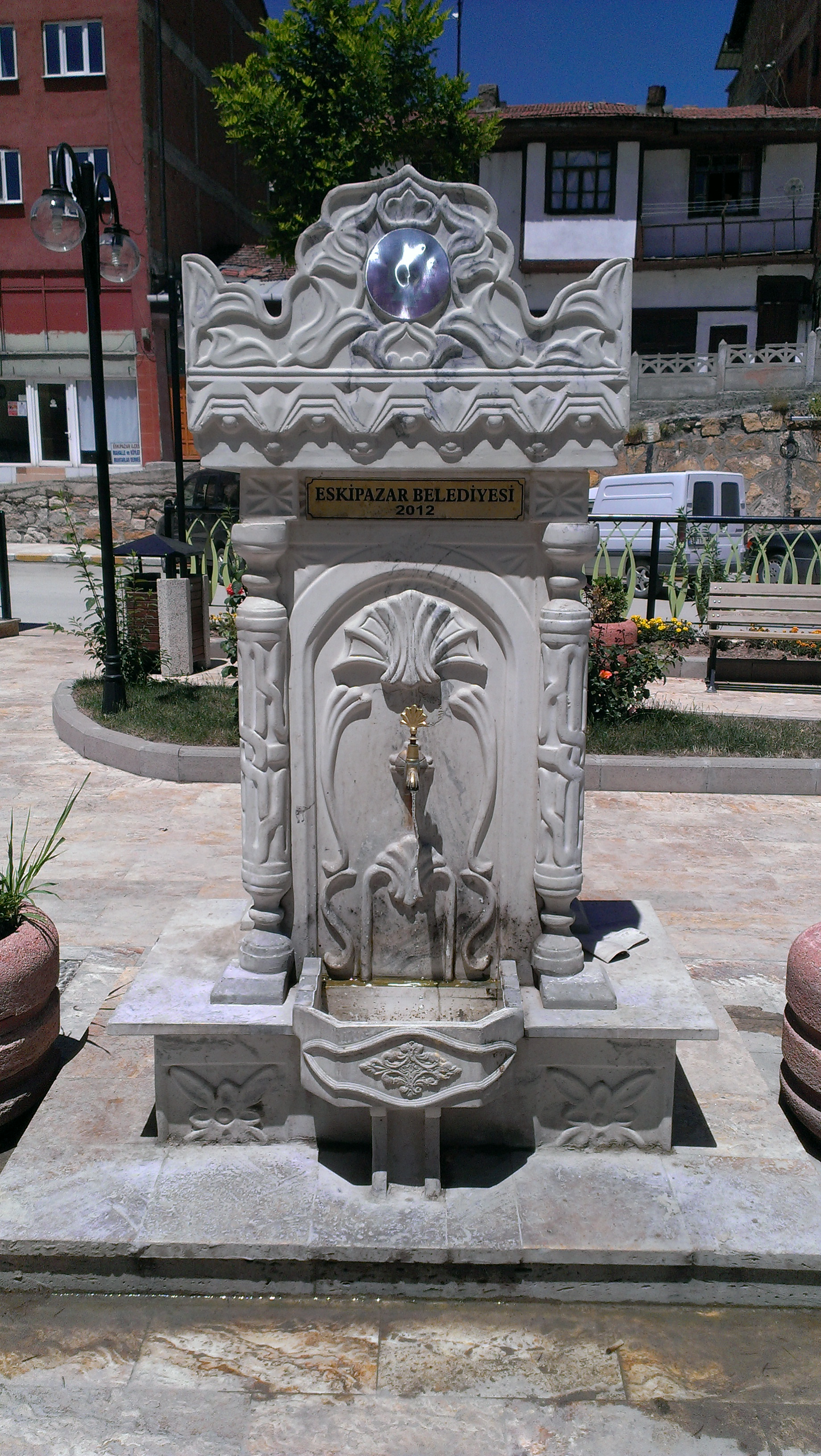
Water fountain in Eskipazar, 2013
