= Nikon the Metanoeite =

10th-century Byzantine monk and Eastern Orthodox saint

Saint Nikon the Metanoeite
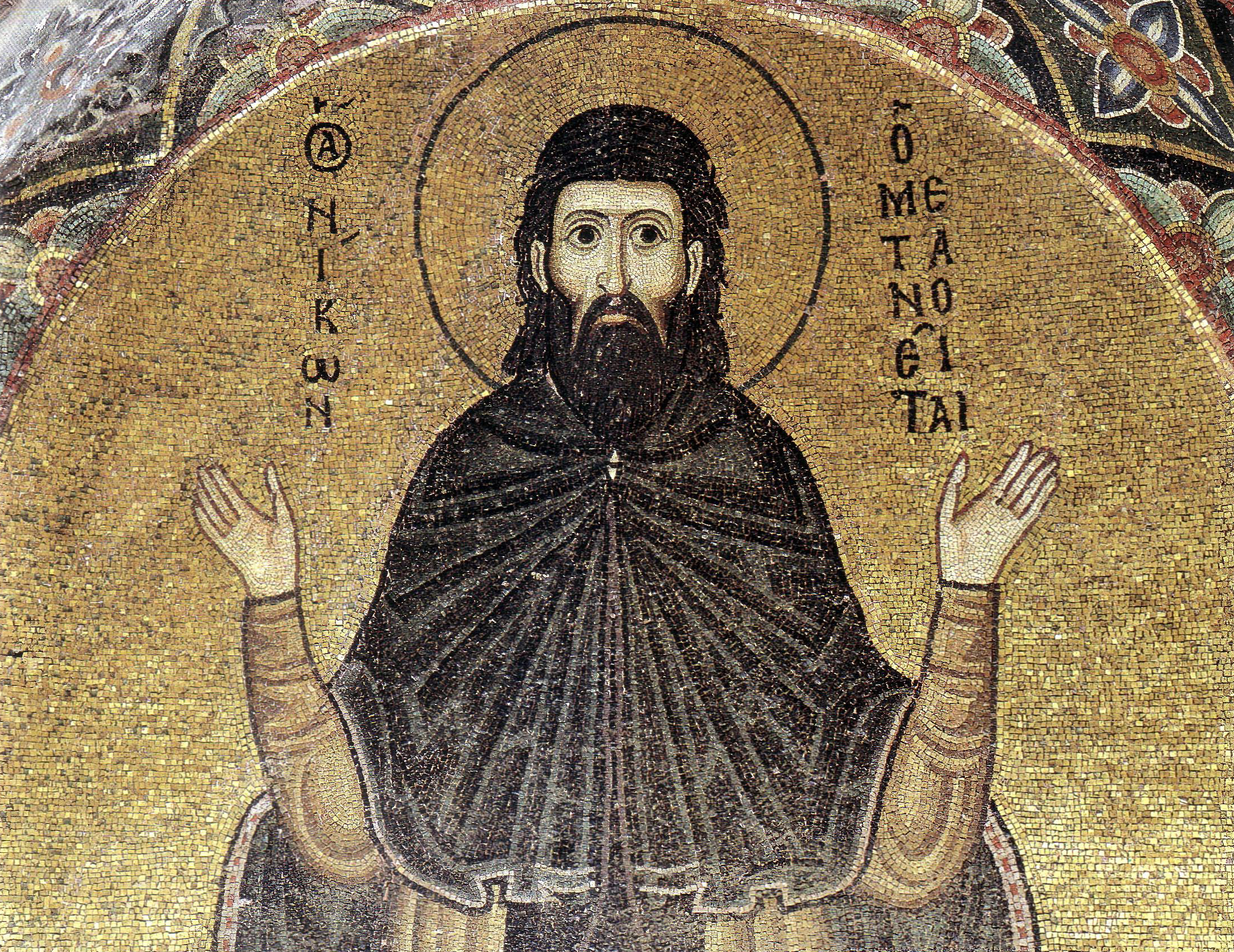
- Mosaic icon of St. Nikon in Hosios Loukas

Venerable
- Born: c. 930; Pontus or Argos, Peloponnese
- Died: 26 November 998
- Venerated in: Eastern Orthodox Church
- Feast: 26 November
- Patronage: Sparta, Laconia

Nikon the "Metanoite" (Greek: Νίκων ὁ Μετανοεῖτε, Nikon ho Metanoeite ("Nikon the Repent!"); c. 930 – 26 November 998) was a Byzantine monk, itinerant preacher, and saint of the Eastern Orthodox Church. According to historian Andrew Louth, Nikon is best understood as the heroic subject of his Life, a hagiography of the saint written after his death by a successor abbot of his monastery.

The Life focuses on Nikon's mission to re-Christianize sections of the Byzantine Empire that had been lost during the early Muslim conquests, particularly the Emirate of Crete, which existed from the late 820s until the Byzantine reconquest in 961. The Life describes Nikon's work on Crete and the central Greek mainland, recounting miracles he performed during and after his life. Nikon himself is represented as a missionary monk in the biography, one who was constantly preaching rather than constantly praying.

== Biography ==
Nikon, of Greek origin, was born in Pontus (modern north-eastern Turkey) or in Argos. When he was young, Nikon went to a monastery known as Khrysopetro ("Golden Stone") located on the borders of Pontus and Paphlagonia. He spent twelve years there, living an ascetic life of prayer and penance so extreme that his brothers tried to persuade him to lessen his regimen. His abbot, impressed by his spiritual discipline and worried that his newly-returned father would draw take from the ascetic life, sent Nikon out into the world to proselytize.

Nikon traveled into Asia Minor and preached repentance there for three years. Following the expulsion of the Arabs from the island of Crete in 961 following the Siege of Chandax, Nikon began his mission on the island, seeking to persuade converts to Islam to revert to Christianity. The area had been a Muslim emirate since the 820s, and in that time Christianity there had declined. Many of the island's Christians were forcibly converted to Islam, and even after the Arab expulsions they feared execution at the hands of extremists or returning Arab soldiers—the punishment prescribed by the hudud for the crime of apostasy against Islam. Even those who remained faithful to Christianity had lost contact with the living tradition, as churches and monasteries had fallen into decay.

According to Nikon's Life, he viewed the forced converts not as Muslims but rather as Christians who had been corrupted "by time and long fellowship with the Saracens." Nikon was forced to change his tactics on Crete, now having to use his wit to lead his listeners to repentance, rather than just preaching the message of repentance. It was there that he acquired the nickname metanoite (Greek for "penitent/repent") for his habit of using it as a preface to all his sermons.

After five years on Crete—no earlier than 966—Nikon visited Epidauros, Athens, and Euboea. He then travelled to Thebes and Corinth, and finally down into the Peloponnese. Tradition credits him with saving the region of Laconia from a plague. While in Sparta, Nikon had three churches and a monastery built as he pursued his mission; according to Life his work was accompanied by miracles.

In his Life, the Peloponnese is represented as a land full of demons which Nikon is constantly struggling against. The isolated Mani Peninsula in particular—the southernmost part of the Peloponnese—had resisted the spread of Christianity even as it had taken firm hold on the mainland. In Laconia Nikon exerted considerable influence on both clergy and laity, founding a large number of churches. He is credited with finally introducing Christianity to Mani and its inhabitants, traditionally known as the Maniots. The Maniots began to convert to Christianity in the 9th century AD, but it wasn't until 200 years later that the Mani was said to be Christian.

After thirty years of preaching in the Peloponnese, he died in a monastery on the peninsula on November 26, 998.

== Legacy ==
According to his biography, Nikon continued to perform miracles posthumously. (Much of Life deals solely with these miracles.) Nikon was canonized by the Eastern Orthodox Church and named patron saint of the city of Sparta. His feast day is celebrated in Laconia and Mani on 26 November.

Nikon is depicted in mosaics in the monastery of Hosios Loukas in Boeotia, founded in the mid-10th century.

== Sources ==
- Abrahamse, Dorothy de F. (1990). "Reviewed work(s): The Life of Saint Nikon. by Denis F. Sullivan". Speculum. 65 (4). Medieval Academy of America: 1060–1061. doi:10.2307/2863634. JSTOR 2863634.
- Anderson, Gerald H. (1999). Biographical Dictionary of Christian Missions. Grand Rapids, Michigan: Wm. B. Eerdmans Publishing. ISBN 0-8028-4680-7.
- Louth, Andrew (2007). Greek East and Latin West: The Church AD 681–1071. Crestwood, N.Y.: St Vladimir’s Seminary Press. ISBN 9780881413205.
- Makrides, Vasilios (2009). Hellenic Temples and Christian Churches: A Concise History of the Religious Cultures of Greece from Antiquity to the Present. New York, New York: New York University Press. ISBN 978-0-8147-9568-2.
- Neville, Leonora Alice (2004). Authority in Byzantine Provincial Society, 950-1100. Cambridge, United Kingdom: Cambridge University Press. ISBN 0-521-83865-7.
- Runciman, Steven; Freely, John (2009). The Lost Capital of Byzantium: The History of Mistra and the Peloponnese. Cambridge, Massachusetts: Harvard University Press. ISBN 978-0-674-03405-1.
- Thurston, Herbert; Attwater, Donald (1956). Lives of the Saints, Volume 4. New York, New York: P. J. Kenedy & Sons.
