= List of populated places in İzmir Province =

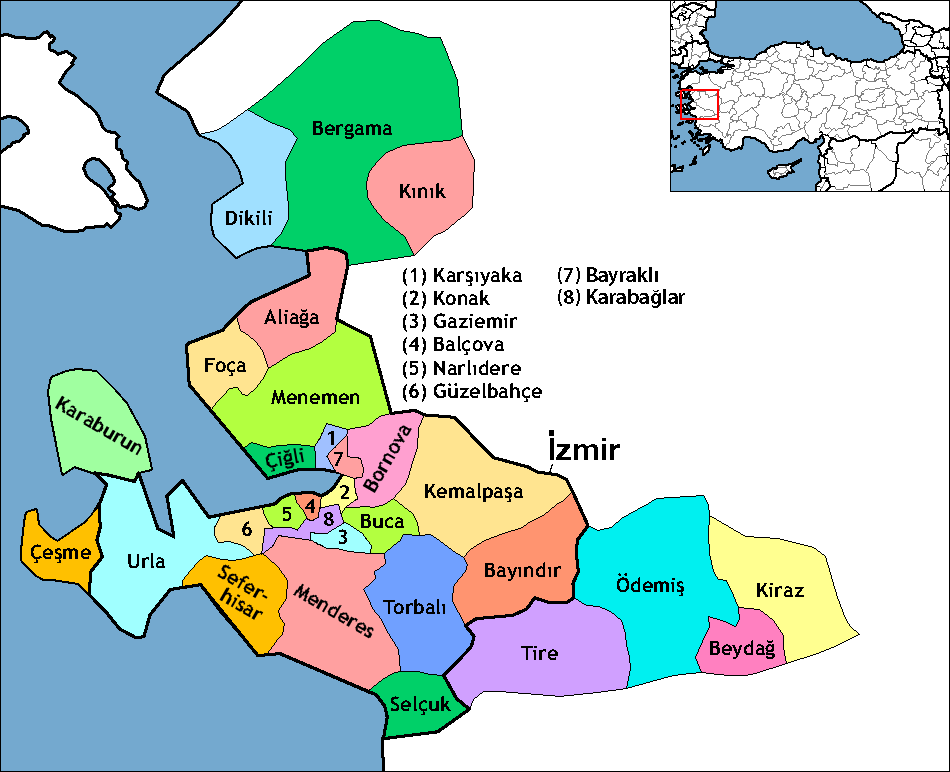
İzmir Province

Below is the list of populated places in İzmir Province, Turkey by district. The first 21 districts (Aliağa-Urla) are parts of Greater İzmir. In the following lists, the first place in each is the administrative center of the district.

== Aliağa ==
- Aliağa
- Aşağışakran, Aliağa
- Bahçedere, Aliağa
- Bozköy, Aliağa
- Çakmaklı, Aliağa
- Çaltılıdere, Aliağa
- Çıtak, Aliağa
- Çoraklar, Aliağa
- Güzelhisar, Aliağa
- Hacıömerli, Aliağa
- Horozgediği, Aliağa
- Kalabak, Aliağa
- Kapukaya, Aliağa
- Karaköy, Aliağa
- Karakuzu, Aliağa
- Samurlu, Aliağa
- Şehitkemal, Aliağa
- Uzunhasanlar, Aliağa
- Yenişakran, Aliağa
- Yüksekköy, Aliağa

== Balçova ==
- Balçova

== Bayındır ==
- Bayındır
- Alankıyı, Bayındır
- Alanköy, Bayındır
- Arıkbaşı, Bayındır
- Balcılar, Bayındır
- Buruncuk, Bayındır
- Çamlıbel, Bayındır
- Çenikler, Bayındır
- Çınardibi, Bayındır
- Çiftçigediği, Bayındır
- Dereköy, Bayındır
- Dernekli, Bayındır
- Elifli, Bayındır
- Ergenli, Bayındır
- Fırınlı, Bayındır
- Gaziler, Bayındır
- Havuzbaşı, Bayındır
- Hisarlık, Bayındır
- Kabaağaç, Bayındır
- Karahalilli, Bayındır
- Karahayıt, Bayındır
- Karapınar, Bayındır
- Kızılcaağaç, Bayındır
- Kızılcaova, Bayındır
- Kızılkeçili, Bayındır
- Kızıloba, Bayındır
- Lütuflar, Bayındır
- Osmanlar, Bayındır
- Pınarlı, Bayındır
- Sarıyurt, Bayındır
- Söğütören, Bayındır
- Tokatbaşı, Bayındır
- Turan, Bayındır
- Yakacık, Bayındır
- Yakapınar, Bayındır
- Yeşilova, Bayındır
- Yusuflu, Bayındır
- Zeytinova, Bayındır

== Bayraklı ==
- Bayraklı

== Bornova ==
- Bornova
- Beşyol, Bornova
- Çamiçi, Bornova
- Çiçekli, Bornova
- Eğridere, Bornova
- Gökdere, Bornova
- Karaçam, Bornova
- Kavaklıdere, Bornova
- Kayadibi, Bornova
- Kurudere, Bornova
- Laka, Bornova
- Sarnıçköy, Bornova
- Yakaköy, Bornova

== Buca ==
- Buca
- Belenbaşı, Buca
- Karacaağaç, Buca
- Kırıklar, Buca
- Doğancılar, Buca

== Çiğli ==
- Çiğli

== Foça ==
- Foça
- Ilıpınar, Foça
- Kozbeyli, Foça
- Yenibağarası, Foça
- Yeniköy, Foça

== Gaziemir ==
- Gaziemir

== Güzelbahçe ==
- Güzelbahçe
- Çamlı, Güzelbahçe
- Küçükkaya, Güzelbahçe
- Payamlı, Güzelbahçe

== Karabağlar ==
- Karabağlar
- Kavacık, Karabağlar
- Tırazlı, Karabağlar

== Karşıyaka ==
- Karşıyaka
- Sancaklı, Karşıyaka
- Yamanlar, Karşıyaka

== Kemalpaşa ==
- Kemalpaşa
- Akalan, Kemalpaşa
- Ansızca, Kemalpaşa
- Aşağıkızılca, Kemalpaşa
- Bayramlı, Kemalpaşa
- Beşpınar, Kemalpaşa
- Cumalı, Kemalpaşa
- Çambel, Kemalpaşa
- Çınarköy, Kemalpaşa
- Damlacık, Kemalpaşa
- Dereköy, Kemalpaşa
- Hamzababa, Kemalpaşa
- Gökçeyurt, Kemalpaşa
- Gökyaka, Kemalpaşa
- Sarıçalı, Kemalpaşa
- Kamberler, Kemalpaşa
- Kızılüzüm, Kemalpaşa
- Nazarköy, Kemalpaşa
- Kuyucak, Kemalpaşa
- Ovacık, Kemalpaşa
- Sarılar, Kemalpaşa
- Sinancılar, Kemalpaşa
- Sütçüler, Kemalpaşa
- Ulucak, Kemalpaşa
- Vişneli, Kemalpaşa
- Yenikurudere, Kemalpaşa
- Yenmiş, Kemalpaşa
- Yeşilköy, Kemalpaşa
- Yeşilyurt, Kemalpaşa
- Yiğitler, Kemalpaşa
- Zeamet, Kemalpaşa

== Konak ==
- Konak

== Menderes ==
- Menderes
- Akçaköy, Menderes
- Ataköy, Menderes
- Çakaltepe, Menderes
- Çamönü, Menderes
- Çatalca, Menderes
- Çile, Menderes
- Çileme, Menderes
- Develi, Menderes
- Efemçukuru, Menderes
- Gölova, Menderes
- Karakuyu, Menderes
- Keler, Menderes
- Kısık, Menderes
- Kuyucak, Menderes
- Künerlik, Menderes
- Sancaklı, Menderes
- Şaşal, Menderes
- Yeniköy, Menderes

== Menemen ==
- Menemen
- Alaniçi, Menemen
- Ayvacık, Menemen
- Belen, Menemen
- Bağcılar, Menemen
- Bozalan, Menemen
- Çaltı, Menemen
- Çukurköy, Menemen
- Doğa, Menemen
- Göktepe, Menemen
- Görece, Menemen
- Hasanlar, Menemen
- Hatundere, Menemen
- İğnedere, Menemen
- Haykıran, Menemen
- Karaorman, Menemen
- Süleymanlı, Menemen
- Telekler, Menemen
- Turgutlar, Menemen
- Yahşelli, Menemen
- Yanıkköy, Menemen

== Narlıdere ==
- Narlıdere

== Seferihisar ==
- Seferihisar
- Beyler, Seferihisar
- Çamtepe, Seferihisar
- Düzce, Seferihisar
- Gödence, Seferihisar
- İhsaniye, Seferihisar
- Kavakdere, Seferihisar
- Orhanlı, Seferihisar
- Turgut, Seferihisar

== Selçuk ==
- Selçuk
- Acarlar, Selçuk
- Barutçu, Selçuk
- Belevi, Selçuk
- Çamlık, Selçuk
- Gökçealan, Selçuk
- Havutçulu, Selçuk
- Sultaniye, Selçuk
- Şirince, Selçuk
- Zeytinköy, Selçuk

== Torbalı ==
- Torbalı
- Ahmetli, Torbalı
- Arslanlar, Torbalı
- Bozköy, Torbalı
- Çakırbeyli, Torbalı
- Çamlıca, Torbalı
- Dağkızılca, Torbalı
- Dağtekke, Torbalı
- Demirci, Torbalı
- Düverlik, Torbalı
- Helvacı, Torbalı
- Kaplancık, Torbalı
- Karakızlar, Torbalı
- Karaot, Torbalı
- Korucuk, Torbalı
- Ormanköy, Torbalı
- Sağlık, Torbalı
- Saipler, Torbalı
- Taşkesik, Torbalı
- Tulum, Torbalı
- Yeniköy, Torbalı
- Yeşilköy, Torbalı
- Yoğurtçular, Torbalı

== Urla ==
- Urla
- Bademler, Urla
- Balıklıova, Urla
- Barbaros, Urla
- Birgi, Urla
- Demircili, Urla
- Gölcük, Urla
- Gülbahçe, Urla
- Kadıovacık, Urla
- Kuşçular, Urla
- Nohutalan, Urla
- Ovacık, Urla
- Yağcılar, Urla
- Zeytineli, Urla
- Zeytinler, Urla
- Uzunkuyu, Urla

== Bergama ==
- Bergama
- Ahmetbeyler, Bergama
- Akçenger, Bergama
- Alacalar, Bergama
- Alhatlı, Bergama
- Alibeyli, Bergama
- Armağanlar, Bergama
- Aşağıbey, Bergama
- Aşağıcuma, Bergama
- Aşağıılgındere, Bergama
- Aşağıkırıklar, Bergama
- Atçılar, Bergama
- Avunduk, Bergama
- Avunduruk, Bergama
- Ayaskent, Bergama
- Ayvatalar, Bergama
- Aziziye, Bergama
- Balaban, Bergama
- Bayramcılar, Bergama
- Bekirler, Bergama
- Bozköy, Bergama
- Bozyerler, Bergama
- Bölcek, Bergama
- Cevaplı, Bergama
- Çakırlar, Bergama
- Çalıbahçe, Bergama
- Çaltıkoru, Bergama
- Çamavlu, Bergama
- Çamköy, Bergama
- Çamoba, Bergama
- Çeltikçi, Bergama
- Çitköy, Bergama
- Çobanlar, Bergama
- Çürükbağlar, Bergama
- Dağıstan, Bergama
- Demircidere, Bergama
- Dereköy, Bergama
- Doğancı, Bergama
- Durmuşlar, Bergama
- Eğiller, Bergama
- Eğrigöl, Bergama
- Ferizler, Bergama
- Gaylan, Bergama
- Göbeller, Bergama
- Göçbeyli, Bergama
- Gökçeyurt, Bergama
- Gültepe, Bergama
- Hacıhamzalar, Bergama
- Hacılar (Dereköy), Bergama
- Hacılar (İsmailli), Bergama
- Halilağalar, Bergama
- Hamzalısüleymaniye, Bergama
- Hisarköy, Bergama
- Ilgıncaber, Bergama
- İkizler, Bergama
- İncecikler, Bergama
- İneşir, Bergama
- İsmailli, Bergama
- Kadıköy, Bergama
- Kadriye, Bergama
- Kaleardı, Bergama
- Kapıkaya, Bergama
- Kaplan (Göçbeyli), Bergama
- Kaplan (Yukanbey), Bergama
- Karahıdırlı, Bergama
- Karalar, Bergama
- Karavelilier, Bergama
- Kaşıkçı, Bergama
- Katrancı, Bergama
- Kıranlı, Bergama
- Kırcalar, Bergama
- Kızıltepe, Bergama
- Kocahaliller, Bergama
- Kocaköy, Bergama
- Koyuneli, Bergama
- Kozluca, Bergama
- Kurfallı, Bergama
- Mahmudiye, Bergama
- Maruflar, Bergama
- Muratlar, Bergama
- Narlıca, Bergama
- Okçular, Bergama
- Oruşlar, Bergama
- Ovacık, Bergama
- Öksüzler, Bergama
- Örenli, Bergama
- Örlemiş, Bergama
- Paşaköy, Bergama
- Pınarköy, Bergama
- Pireveliler, Bergama
- Rahmanlar, Bergama
- Sağancı, Bergama
- Sarıcalar, Bergama
- Sarıcaoğlu, Bergama
- Sarıdere, Bergama
- Seklik, Bergama
- Sindel, Bergama
- Süleymanlı, Bergama
- Tavukçukuru, Bergama
- Teğelti, Bergama
- Tekkedere, Bergama
- Tekkeköy, Bergama
- Tepeköy, Bergama
- Terzihaliller, Bergama
- Tırmanlar, Bergama
- Topallar, Bergama
- Üçtepe, Bergama
- Ürkütler, Bergama
- Yalnızdam, Bergama
- Yalnızev, Bergama
- Yenikent, Bergama
- Yeniler, Bergama
- Yerlitahtacı, Bergama
- Yortanlı, Bergama
- Yukarıada, Bergama
- Yukarıbey, Bergama
- Yukarıcuma, Bergama
- Yukarıkırıklar, Bergama
- Zağnoz, Bergama
- Zeytindağ, Bergama

== Beydağ ==
- Beydağ
- Adaküre, Beydağ
- Alakeçili, Beydağ
- Bakırköy, Beydağ
- Çamlık, Beydağ
- Çiftlikköy, Beydağ
- Çomaklar, Beydağ
- Eğridere, Beydağ
- Erikli, Beydağ
- Halıköy, Beydağ
- Karaoba, Beydağ
- Kurudere, Beydağ
- Menderes, Beydağ
- Mutaflar, Beydağ
- Palamutçuk, Beydağ
- Sarıkaya, Beydağ
- Tabaklar, Beydağ
- Yağcılar, Beydağ
- Yeniyurt, Beydağ
- Yeşiltepe, Beydağ
- Yukarıaktepe, Beydağ
- Yukarıtosunlar, Beydağ

== Çeşme ==
- Çeşme
- Alaçatı, Çeşme
- Germiyan, Çeşme
- Ildır, Çeşme
- Karaköy, Çeşme
- Ovacık, Çeşme

== Dikili ==
- Dikili
- Bademli, Dikili
- Bahçeli, Dikili
- Çağlan, Dikili
- Çandarlı, Dikili
- Çukuralanı, Dikili
- Deliktaş, Dikili
- Demirtaş, Dikili
- Denizköy, Dikili
- Esentepe, Dikili
- Gökçeağıl, Dikili
- İslamlar, Dikili
- Kabakum, Dikili
- Katıralanı, Dikili
- Kıratlı, Dikili
- Kıroba, Dikili
- Kızılçukur, Dikili
- Kocaoba, Dikili
- Mazılı, Dikili
- Merdivenli, Dikili
- Nebiler, Dikili
- Salihler, Dikili
- Samanlıkköy, Dikili
- Uzunburun, Dikili
- Yahşibey, Dikili
- Yaylayurt, Dikili
- Yenice, Dikili

== Karaburun ==
- Karaburun
- Anbarseki, Karaburun
- Bozköy, Karaburun
- Eğlenhoca, Karaburun
- Hasseki, Karaburun
- İnecik, Karaburun
- Kösedere, Karaburun
- Küçükbahçe, Karaburun
- Mordoğan, Karaburun
- Parlak, Karaburun
- Saip, Karaburun
- Salman, Karaburun
- Sarpıncık, Karaburun
- Tepeboz, Karaburun
- Yayla, Karaburun

== Kınık ==
- Kınık
- Arpadere, Kınık
- Arpaseki, Kınık
- Aziziye, Kınık
- Bademalan, Kınık
- Bağalan, Kınık
- Balaban, Kınık
- Büyükoba, Kınık
- Cumalı, Kınık
- Çaltı, Kınık
- Çanköy, Kınık
- Çiftlikköy, Kınık
- Değirmencieli, Kınık
- Dündarlı, Kınık
- Elmadere, Kınık
- Hamzahocalı, Kınık
- Işıklar, Kınık
- İbrahimağa, Kınık
- Kalemköy, Kınık
- Karadere, Kınık
- Karatekeli, Kınık
- Kocaömer, Kınık
- Kodukburun, Kınık
- Köseler, Kınık
- Mıstıklar, Kınık
- Musacalı, Kınık
- Örtülü, Kınık
- Poyracık, Kınık
- Sucahlı, Kınık
- Taştepe, Kınık
- Yayakent, Kınık
- Yaylaköy, Kınık

== Kiraz ==
- Kiraz
- Ahmetler, Kiraz
- Akpınar, Kiraz
- Altınoluk, Kiraz
- Arkacılar, Kiraz
- Avunduruk, Kiraz
- Aydoğdu, Kiraz
- Bahçearası, Kiraz
- Başaran, Kiraz
- Ceritler, Kiraz
- Cevizli, Kiraz
- Çanakçı, Kiraz
- Çatak, Kiraz
- Çayağzı, Kiraz
- Çömlekçi, Kiraz
- Doğancılar, Kiraz
- Dokuzlar, Kiraz
- Emenler, Kiraz
- Gedik, Kiraz
- Haliller, Kiraz
- Hisar, Kiraz
- İğdeli, Kiraz
- Kaleköy, Kiraz
- Karabağ, Kiraz
- Karabulu, Kiraz
- Karaburç, Kiraz
- Karaman, Kiraz
- Kibar, Kiraz
- Mavidere, Kiraz
- Mersinlidere, Kiraz
- Olgunlar, Kiraz
- Ovacık, Kiraz
- Ören, Kiraz
- Örencik, Kiraz
- Pınarbaşı, Kiraz
- Saçlı, Kiraz
- Sarıkaya, Kiraz
- Sarısu, Kiraz
- Sırımlı, Kiraz
- Solaklar, Kiraz
- Suludere, Kiraz
- Şemsiler, Kiraz
- Taşlıyatak, Kiraz
- Tekbıçaklar, Kiraz
- Tumbullar, Kiraz
- Umurcalı, Kiraz
- Umurlu, Kiraz
- Uzunköy, Kiraz
- Veliler, Kiraz
- Yağlar, Kiraz
- Yeniköy, Kiraz
- Yenişehir, Kiraz
- Yeşildere, Kiraz

== Ödemiş ==
- Ödemiş
- Alaşarlı, Ödemiş
- Artıcak, Ödemiş
- Bademli, Ödemiş
- Balabanlı, Ödemiş
- Bayırlı, Ödemiş
- Bebekler, Ödemiş
- Beyazıtlar, Ödemiş
- Bıçakçı, Ödemiş
- Birgi, Ödemiş
- Bozcayaka, Ödemiş
- Bozdağ, Ödemiş
- Bucak, Ödemiş
- Bülbüller, Ödemiş
- Büyükavulcuk, Ödemiş
- Cevizalan, Ödemiş
- Çağlayan, Ödemiş
- Çamlıca, Ödemiş
- Çamyayla, Ödemiş
- Çayır, Ödemiş
- Çaylı, Ödemiş
- Çobanlar, Ödemiş
- Demircili, Ödemiş
- Demirdere, Ödemiş
- Dereuzunyer, Ödemiş
- Dolaylar, Ödemiş
- Elmabağ, Ödemiş
- Emirli, Ödemiş
- Ertuğrul, Ödemiş
- Gerçekli, Ödemiş
- Gereli, Ödemiş
- Gölcük, Ödemiş
- Güney, Ödemiş
- Günlüce, Ödemiş
- Hacıhasan, Ödemiş
- Hamam, Ödemiş
- Horzum, Ödemiş
- Işık, Ödemiş
- İlkkurşun, Ödemiş
- Karadoğan, Ödemiş
- Karakova, Ödemiş
- Kayaköy, Ödemiş
- Kaymakçı, Ödemiş
- Kazanlı, Ödemiş
- Kemenler, Ödemiş
- Kemer, Ödemiş
- Kerpiçlik, Ödemiş
- Kışla, Ödemiş
- Kızılca, Ödemiş
- Kızılcahavlu, Ödemiş
- Konaklı, Ödemiş
- Köfündere, Ödemiş
- Köseler, Ödemiş
- Kurucuova, Ödemiş
- Kutlubeyler, Ödemiş
- Küçükavulcuk, Ödemiş
- Küçükören, Ödemiş
- Küre, Ödemiş
- Mescitli, Ödemiş
- Mursallı, Ödemiş
- Ocaklı, Ödemiş
- Oğuzlar, Ödemiş
- Orhangazi, Ödemiş
- Ortaköy, Ödemiş
- Ovacık, Ödemiş
- Ovakent, Ödemiş
- Pirinççi, Ödemiş
- Sekiköy, Ödemiş
- Seyrekli, Ödemiş
- Suçıktı, Ödemiş
- Süleymanlar, Ödemiş
- Şirinköy, Ödemiş
- Tosunlar, Ödemiş
- Türkönü, Ödemiş
- Uzundere, Ödemiş
- Üçkonak, Ödemiş
- Üzümlü, Ödemiş
- Veliler, Ödemiş
- Yeniceköy, Ödemiş
- Yeniköy, Ödemiş
- Yeşilköy, Ödemiş
- Yılanlı, Ödemiş
- Yolüstü, Ödemiş
- Yusufdere, Ödemiş

== Tire ==
- Tire, İzmir
- Akçaşehir, Tire
- Akkoyunlu, Tire
- Akmescit, Tire
- Akyurt, Tire
- Alacalı, Tire
- Alaylı, Tire
- Armutlu, Tire
- Ayaklıkırı, Tire
- Başköy, Tire
- Boynuyoğun, Tire
- Büyükkale, Tire
- Büyükkemerdere, Tire
- Büyükkömürcü, Tire
- Cambazlı, Tire
- Çayırlı, Tire
- Çeriközü, Tire
- Çiniyeri, Tire
- Çobanköy, Tire
- Çukurköy, Tire
- Dağdere, Tire
- Dallık, Tire
- Derebaşı, Tire
- Dereli, Tire
- Dibekçi, Tire
- Doyranlı, Tire
- Dündarlı, Tire
- Eğridere, Tire
- Eskioba, Tire
- Gökçen, Tire
- Halkapınar, Tire
- Hasançavuşlar, Tire
- Hisarlık, Tire
- Işıklar, Tire
- Işıklı, Tire
- Kaplan, Tire
- Karateke, Tire
- Kırtepe, Tire
- Kızılcahavlu, Tire
- Kireli, Tire
- Kocaaliler, Tire
- Kurşak, Tire
- Küçükburun, Tire
- Küçükkale, Tire
- Küçükkemerdere, Tire
- Küçükkömürcü, Tire
- Kürdüllü, Tire
- Mahmutlar, Tire
- Mehmetler, Tire
- Musalar, Tire
- Ortaköy, Tire
- Osmancık, Tire
- Peşrefli, Tire
- Sarılar, Tire
- Saruhanlı, Tire
- Somak, Tire
- Topalak, Tire
- Toparlar, Tire
- Turgutlu, Tire
- Üzümler, Tire
- Yamandere, Tire
- Yeğenli, Tire
- Yemişler, Tire
- Yeniçiftlik, Tire
- Yenioba, Tire
- Yenişehir, Tire

== Recent development ==
According to Law act no 6360, all Turkish provinces with a population more than 750 000, were renamed as metropolitan municipality. All districts in those provinces became second level municipalities and all villages in those districts were renamed as a neighborhoods . Thus the villages listed above are officially neighborhoods of İzmir.
