= Kalem Island =

Island in Turkey

Native name: Kalem Adası
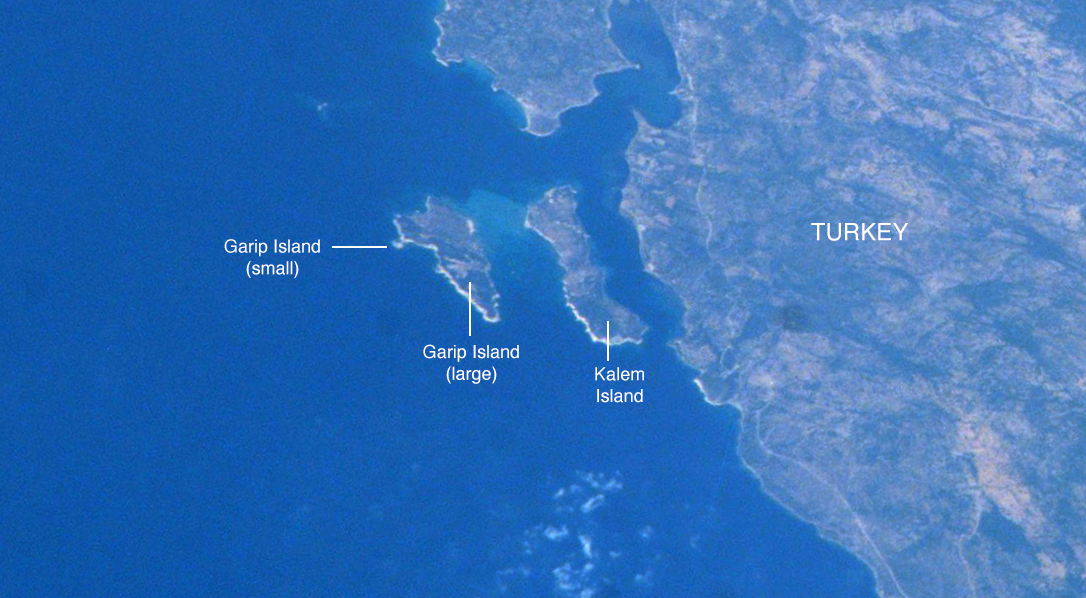
- NASA image showing Kalem Island and nearby Garip Islands

- Location within Turkey

Geography
- Location: Aegean Sea
- Coordinates: 39°0′12″N 26°47′42″E

Administration
- Turkey
- İl (province): İzmir Province
- İlçe: Dikili

Kalem Island (Turkish: Kalem Adası, literally "Pen Island") is an Aegean island of Turkey. Administratively, the island is a part of Dikili ilçe (district) of İzmir Province at 9°0′12″N 26°47′42″E. It is close to Bademli town and its distance to main land (Anatolia) is about 400 metres (1,300 ft). It is a narrow island where the maximum length in the north to south direction is about 1.5 kilometres (0.93 mi)

The island and Garip Island to the west were known as two of the three Arginusae islands (Greek: Ἀργινούσαι Arginóusai) in antiquity (the third island Canae is now a peninsula).

The naval battle of Arginusae was fought around Kalem island in 406 B.C.

The island is a private property. There is a hotel and a beach for tourists and divers.

== Gallery ==
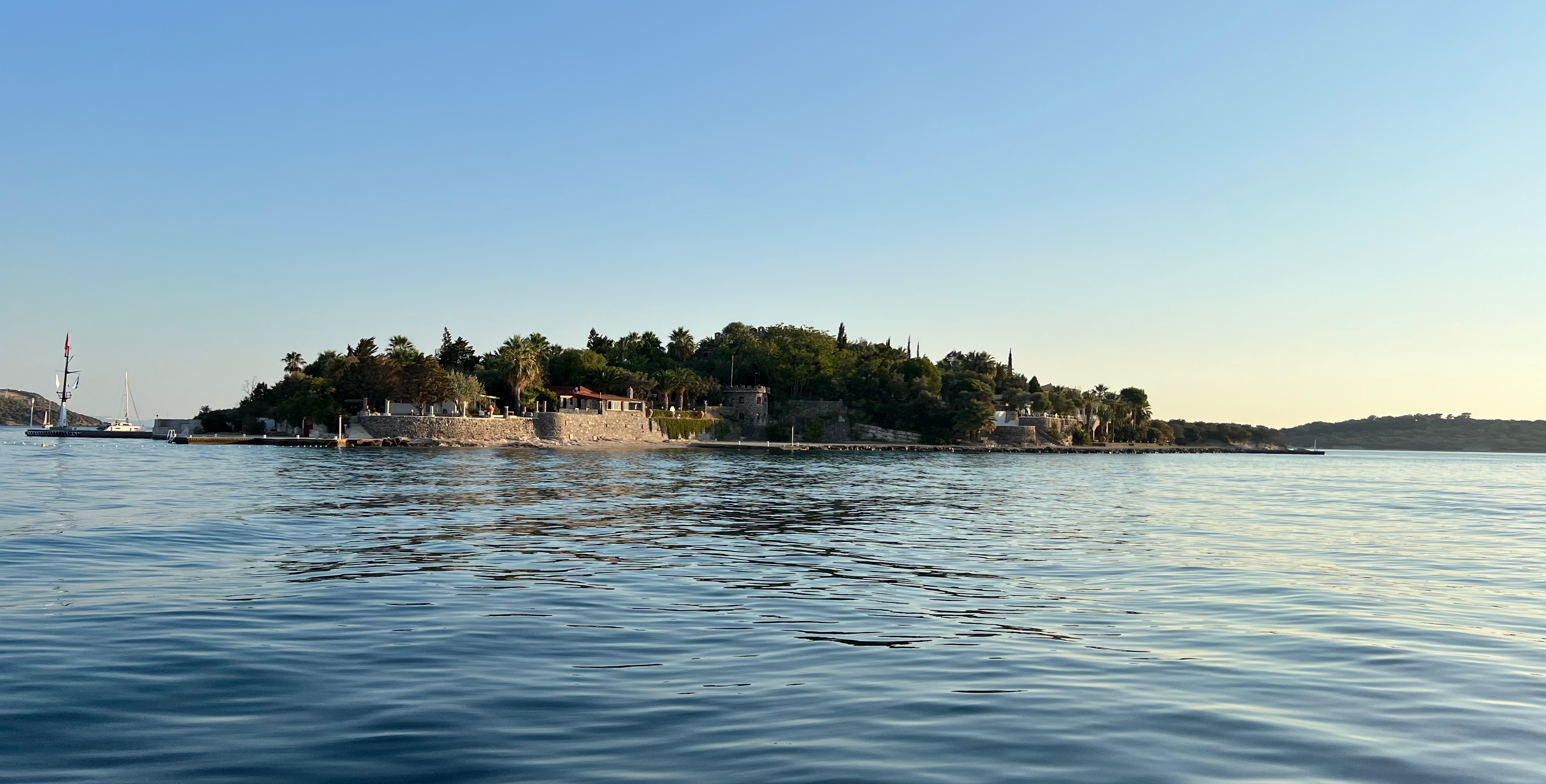
Northern tip of Kalem Island with hotel

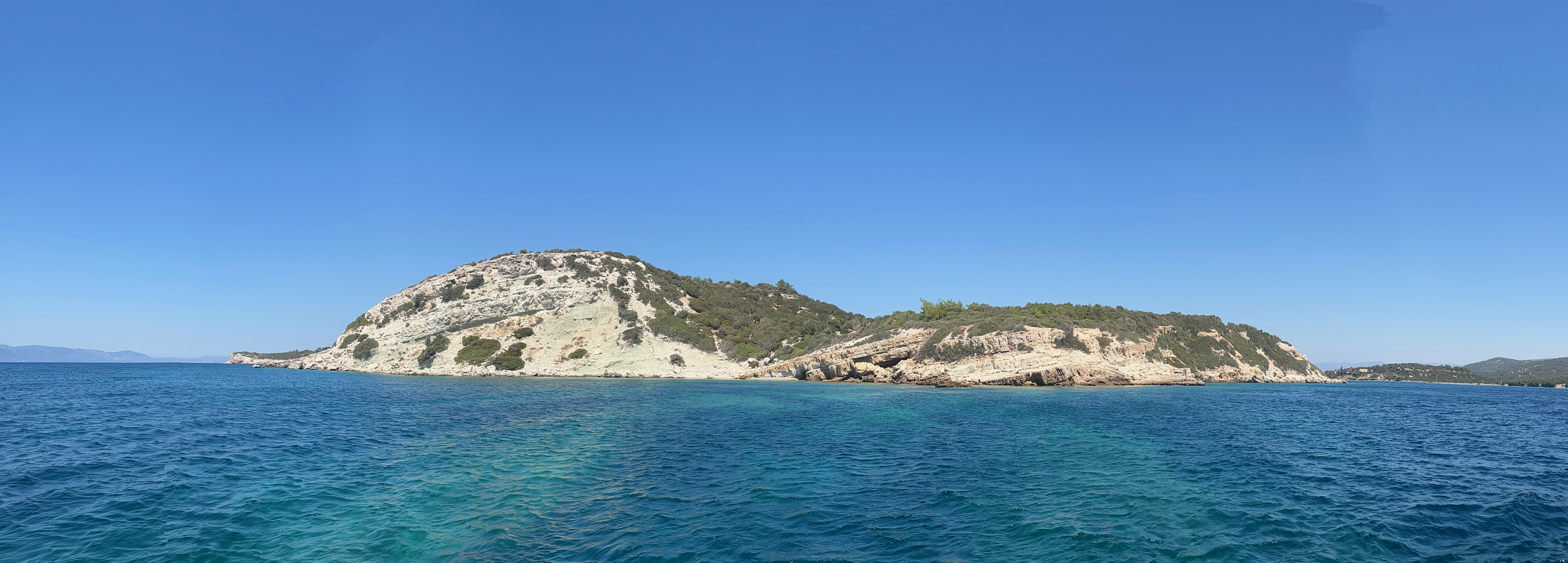
Kalem Island southern coast

Coming around the south eastern tip of Kalem Island

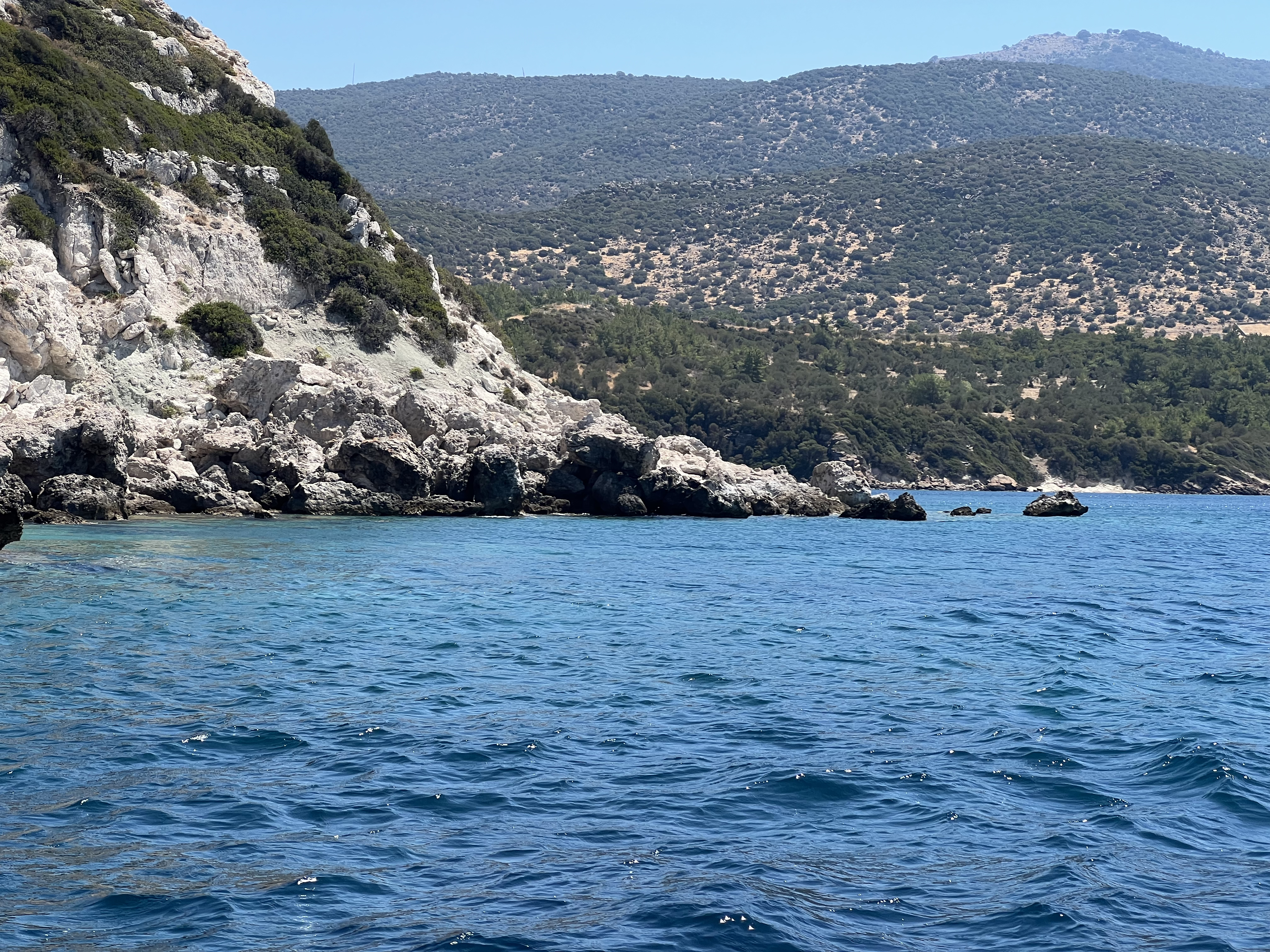
Rocks on the southern tip of the coast of Kalem Island, Turkey

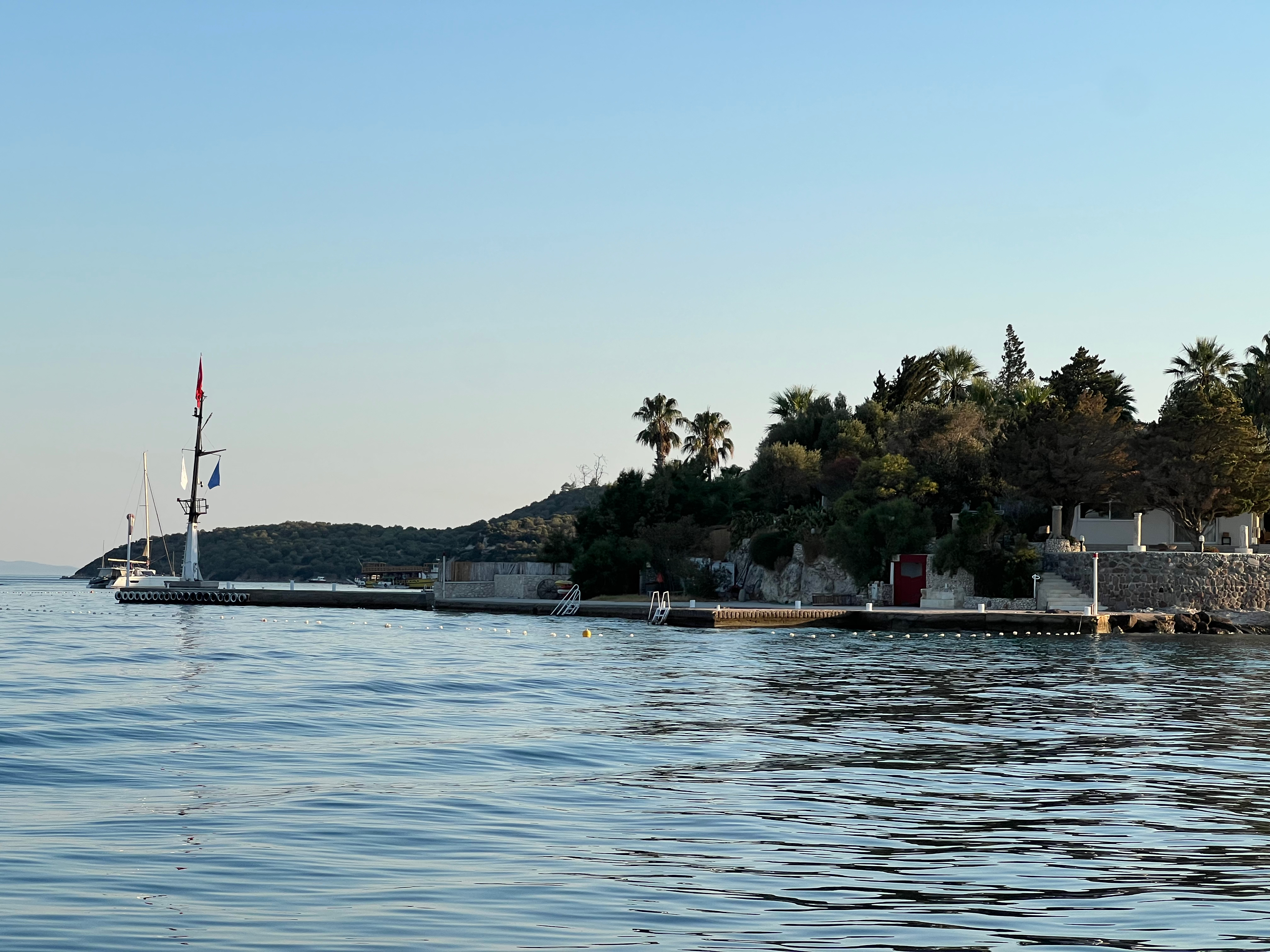
North west coastal tip of Kalem Island with hotel

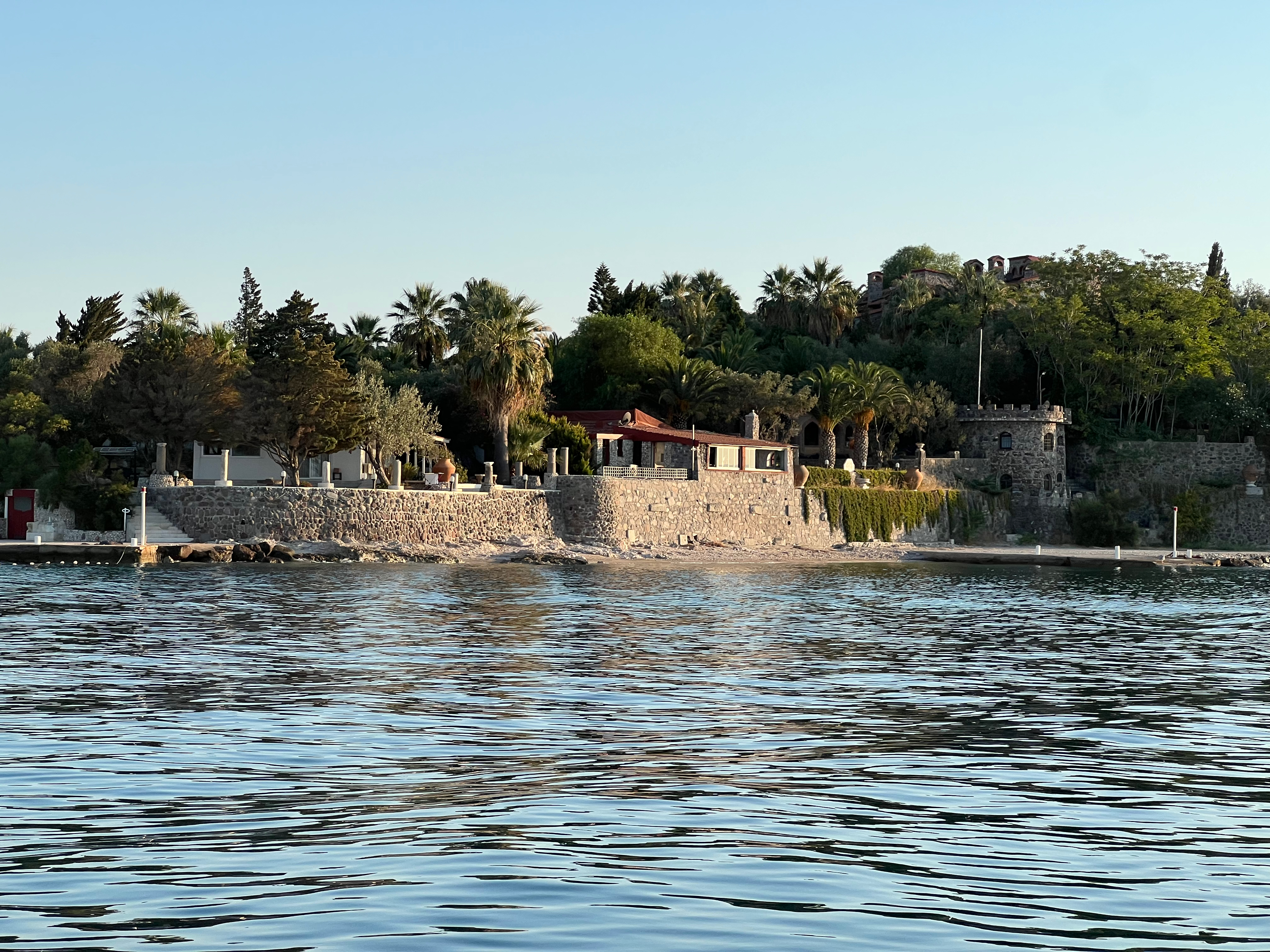
North west coast of Kalem Island with hotel

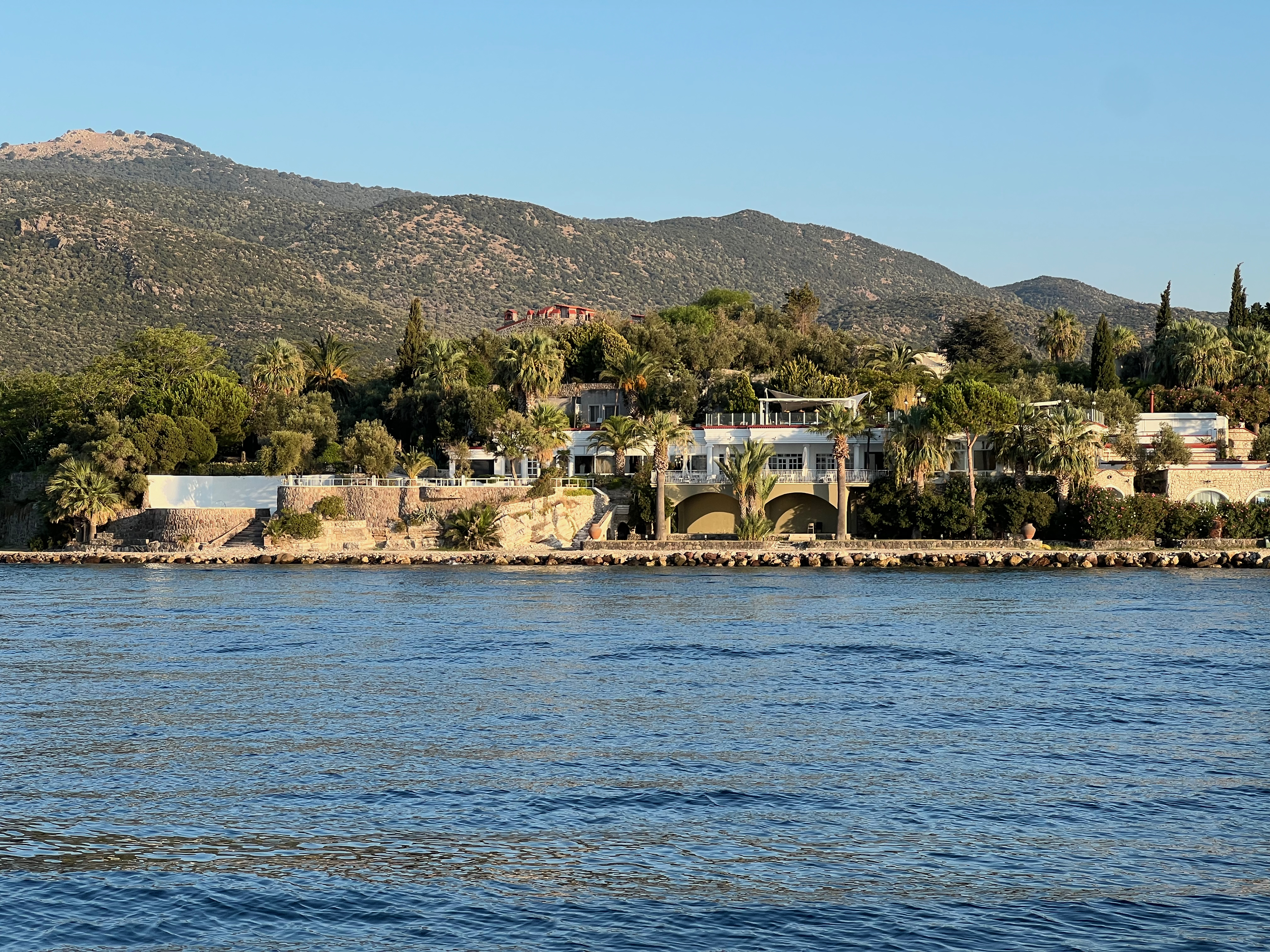
Hotel on north west coast of Kalem Island

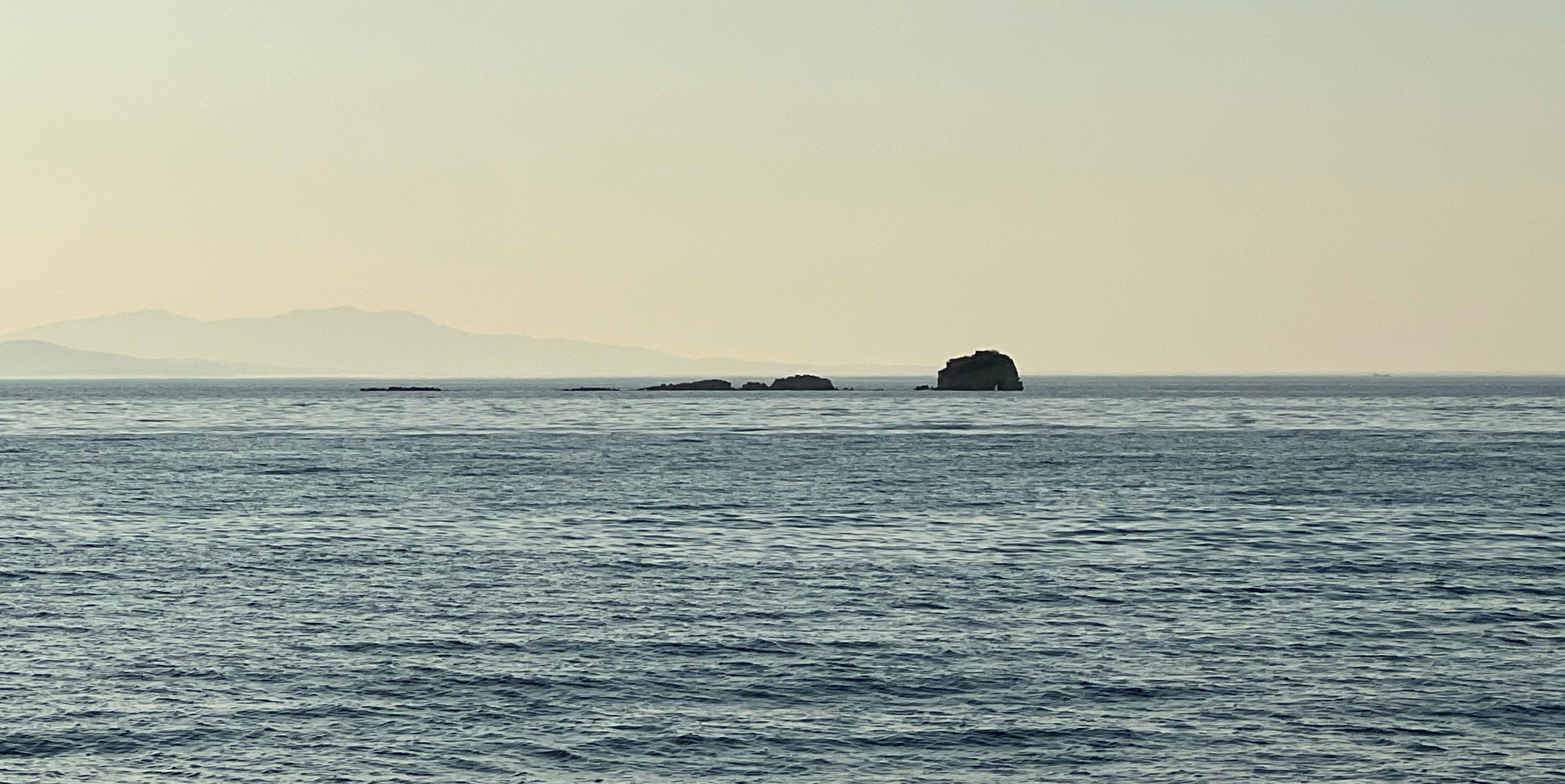
Rocks northwest of Kalem island

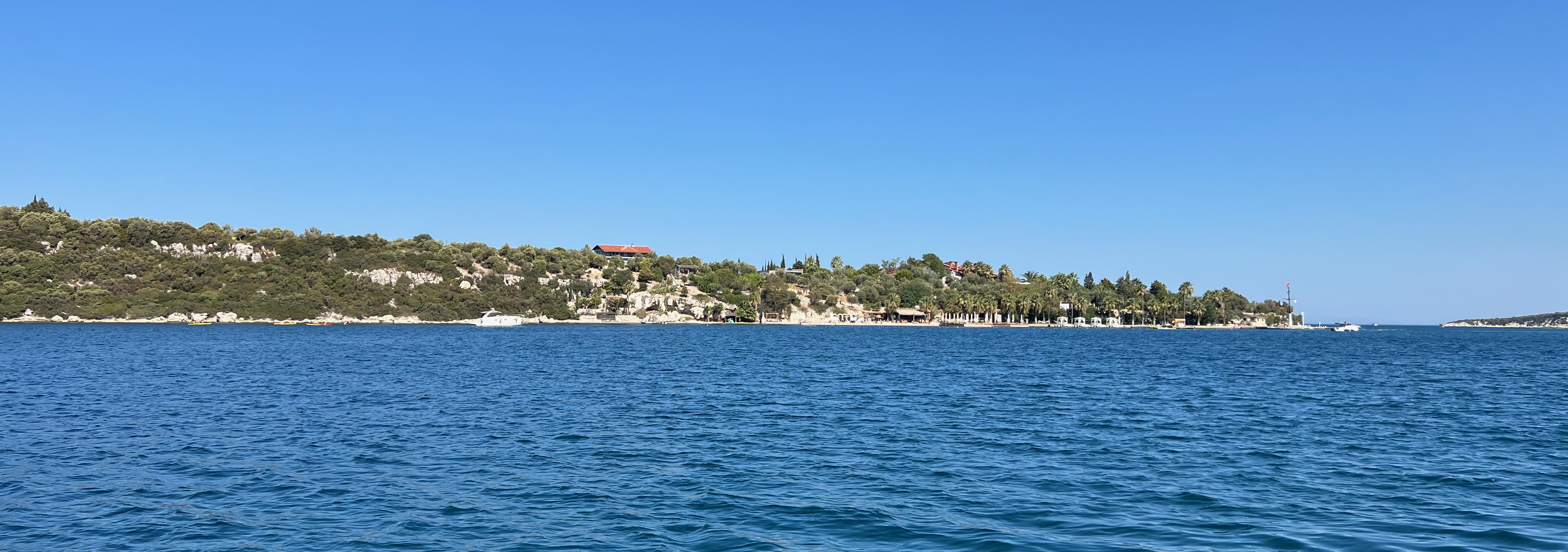
North eastern coast of Kalem Island

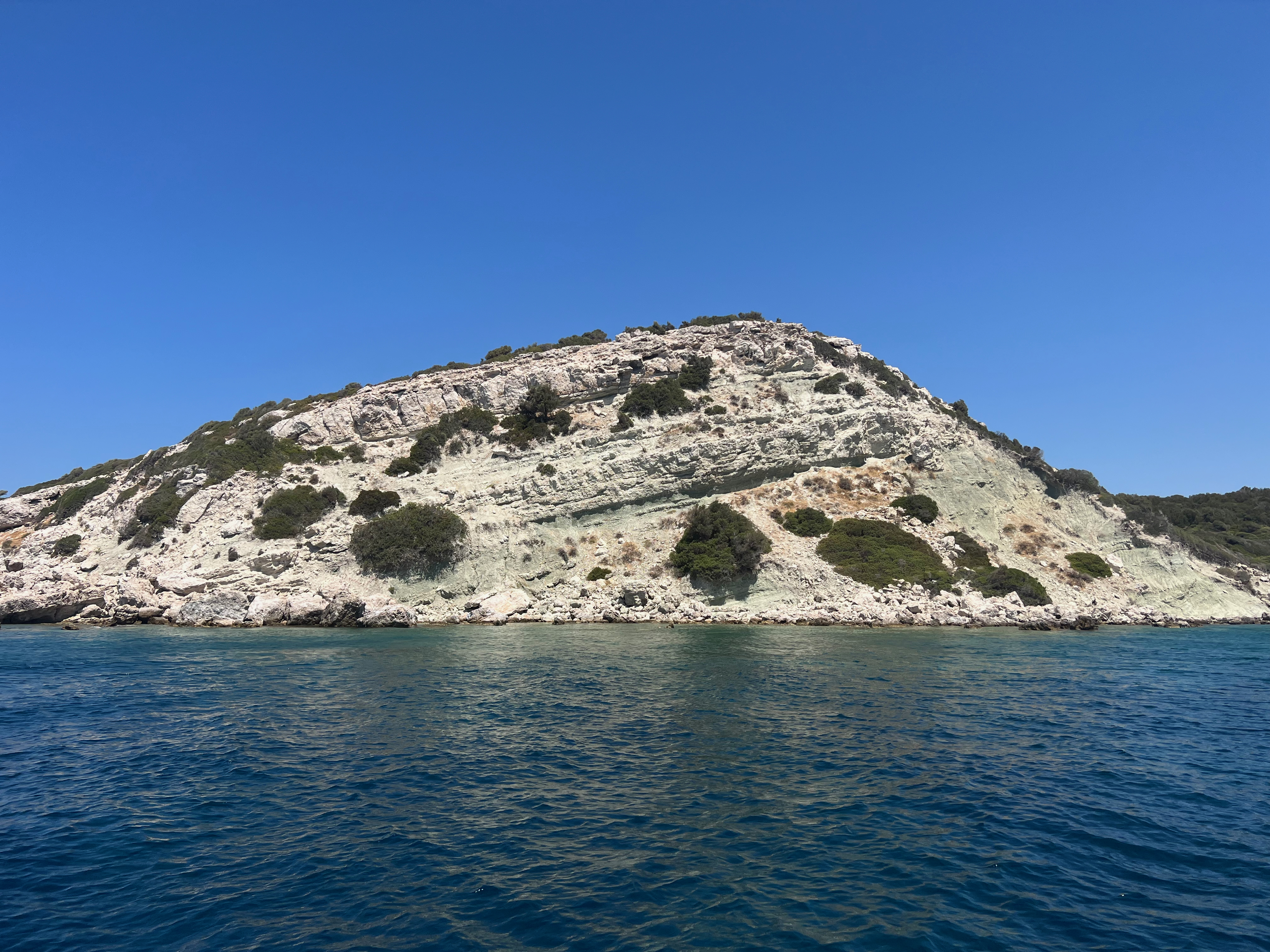
Kalem Island stratified rocks

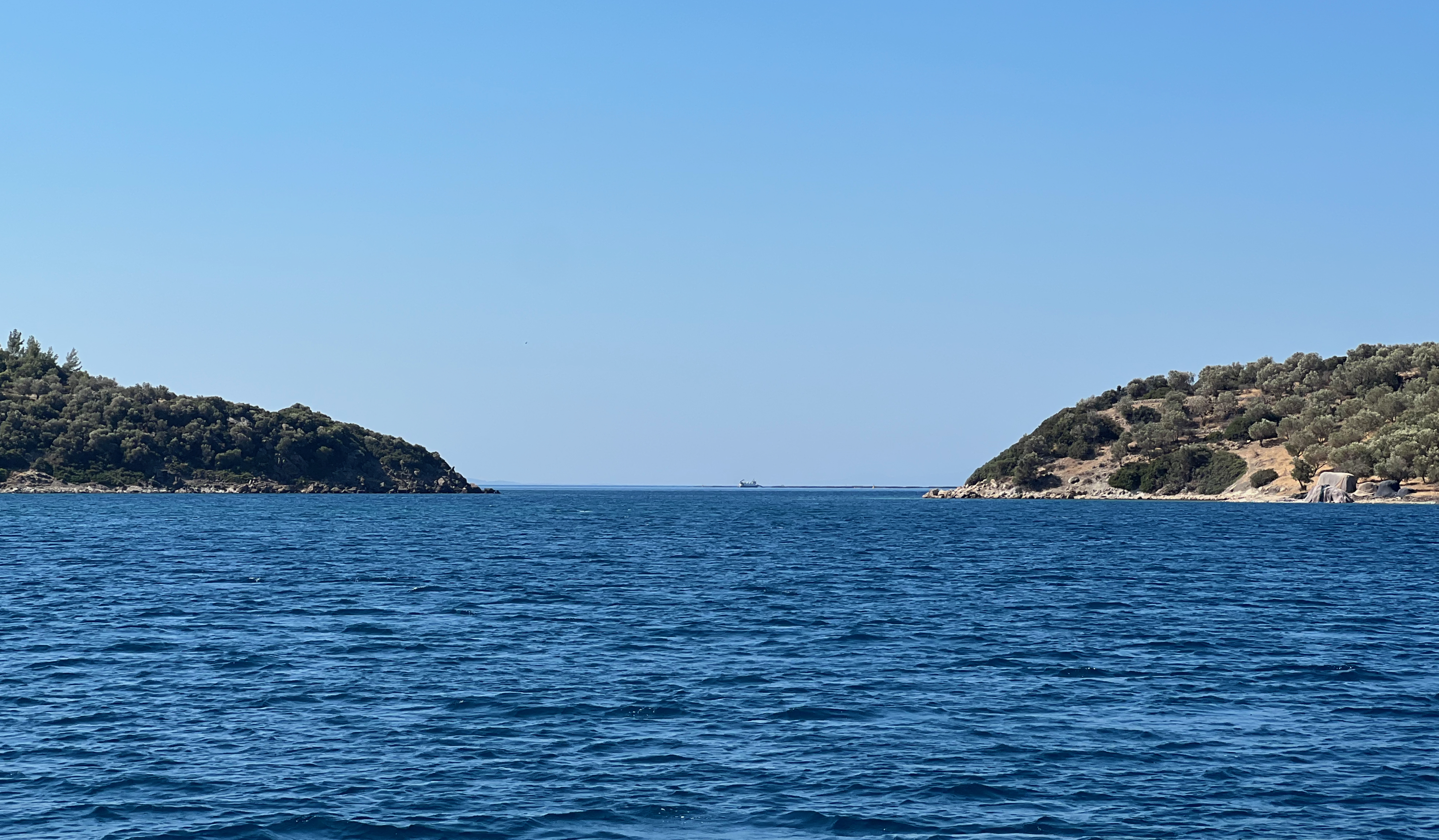
Gap between Kalem Island south coast on right and mainland Bademli, Turkey

Unfinished hotel on east coast of Kalem Island
