= Yunt Mountains =

Mountain range in Turkey

Coordinates: 36.511°N 32.625°E

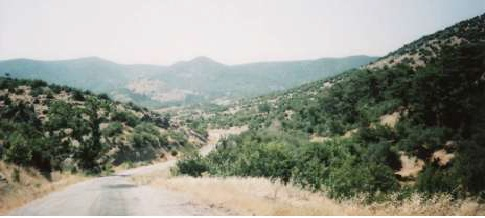
View from the eastern slopes of Mount Yunt

Yunt Mountains are in western Anatolia, Aegean Region of Turkey.

== Geography ==
They are a mountain range and located in İzmir Province and Manisa provinces of Turkey. They are near the districts of Soma, Kınık, Kırkağaç and Bergama.

== History ==
According to ancient time geographer Strabon, the name of the Yunt Mountains in old times were Aspordenon. Aigai, one of the twelve cities of ancient Aeolis is on the Yunt Mountains in modern Manisa province. Gambrium and Paleogambrion cities, which are mentioned in Anabasis of Xenophon, are on the Yunt Mountains near Bergama and Kınık districts. In the Hellenistic Period, Philetairos, who was the founder of Pergamon Kingdom and Attalid Dynasty, built a sanctuary dedicated to Magna Mater, Cybele on the Yunt Mountains near Kınık district.

== Footnotes ==
- Strabon, Geography, (Books: XII, XIII, XIV)
- Esther V.Hansen, The Attalids of Pergamon, Cornell University Press, 1971
- Sefa Taşkın, Pergamon Kadınları, Arkeoloji ve Sanat Yayınları, 2011
