= 246 Asporina =

Main-belt asteroid

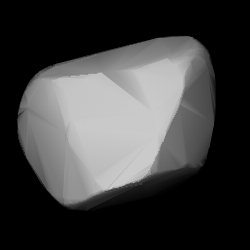
- 3D model based on lightcurve data

Discovery
- Discovered by: Alphonse Borrelly
- Discovery date: 6 March 1885

Designations
- Named after: Asporina
- Alternative designations: A885 EA
- Minor planet category: Main belt

Orbital characteristics
- Epoch 31 July 2016 (JD 2457600.5)
- Uncertainty parameter 0
- Observation arc: 130.96 yr (47834 d)
- Aphelion: 2.98941 AU (447.209 Gm)
- Perihelion: 2.39768 AU (358.688 Gm)
- Semi-major axis: 2.69355 AU (402.949 Gm)
- Eccentricity: 0.10984
- Orbital period (sidereal): 4.42 yr (1614.7 d)
- Average orbital speed: 18.14 km/s
- Mean anomaly: 172.414°
- Mean motion: 0° 13^{m} 22.638^{s} / day
- Inclination: 15.6259°
- Longitude of ascending node: 162.347°
- Argument of perihelion: 96.6218°

Physical characteristics
- Dimensions: 60.10±4.2 km
- Synodic rotation period: 16.222 h (0.6759 d)
- Geometric albedo: 0.1744±0.027
- Spectral type: R
- Absolute magnitude (H): 8.62

246 Asporina is a sizeable main-belt asteroid. It is classified as one of the few A-type asteroids.

It was discovered by Alphonse Borrelly on 6 March 1885 in Marseille and was named after Asporina, a goddess worshipped on Mount Asporenus (or Aspordenus), Asia Minor. This location is known in the modern day as the Yunt Mountains, and Asporina is sometimes identified with the goddess Cybele.

The spectrum of 246 Asporina reveals the strong presence of the mineral olivine, a relative rarity in the asteroid belt.
