= Yahşibey =

- Neighbourhood
- Location in Turkey Yahşibey (İzmir)
- Coordinates: 39°02′N 26°51′E
- Country: Turkey
- Province: İzmir
- District: Dikili
- Elevation: 60 m (200 ft)
- Population (2022): 234
- Time zone: UTC+3 (TRT)
- Postal code: 35980
- Area code: 0232

Yahşibey is a neighbourhood in the municipality and district of Dikili, İzmir Province, Turkey. Its population is 234 (2022). It is 1 kilometre (0.62 mi) east of the Aegean Sea coast and it is almost merged to Bademli.
