= Çukuralanı =

Çukuralan is the name of the following villages in Turkey:

- Çukuralanı, Dikili
- Çukuralan, Ağrı
