= Garip Island =

Group of islands in Turkey

Garip Islands
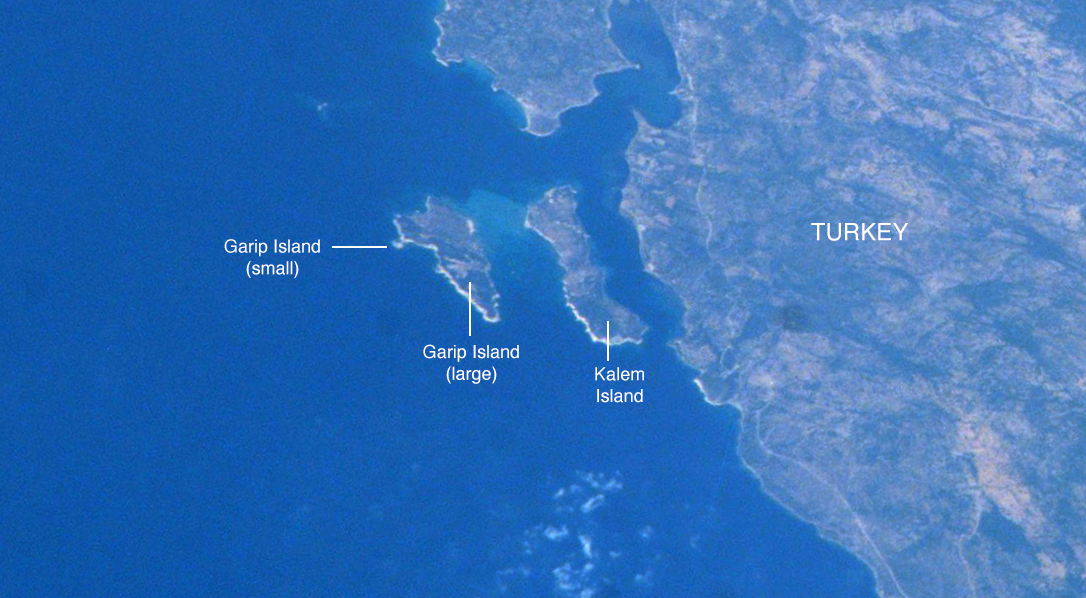
- NASA image from 2003 showing Garip Islands and nearby Kalem Island
- Interactive map of Garip Islands

Geography
- Location: Turkey, Aegean Sea
- Coordinates: 39°0′23″N 26°47′8″E

Administration
- Turkey

Garip Island consists of two islands (the larger island is 88 acres) off the coast of Dikili ilçe in İzmir Province, Turkey. Together they are called the Garip Islands (Turkish: Garip Adaları), at the cut point of Dikili's Bademli Bay. Both islands face the Greek island of Lesbos.

The islands are at 39°00′N 26°47′E, just to the west of Kalem Island. The distance between the two is about 500 metres (1,600 ft). It has a surface area of 357,731.84 square meters. The nearest point on the mainland (Anatolia) is about 1 kilometre (0.62 mi) to the north east. In antiquity these islands, along with a third island that has now joined the mainland, were known as the Arginusae; they were the site of the Battle of Arginusae in 406 BC.

In Turkish Garip can mean ‘weird’, ‘strange’ or ‘desolate’ among other meanings.

Location of Garip Island in Turkey

Offered for sale under a single title deed in 2006, the islands were sold to Fiyapı, a Turkish development group in 2010. No construction was undertaken on the islands.

In 2007 the Guardian newspaper in the UK published a story claiming that a group on the Greek island of Lesbos planned to buy the island, but the sale was never completed. Since 2016, the island is owned by the Savings Deposit Insurance Fund of Turkey.

In 2015 an international group of archaeologists claimed that Garip Island was a lost island in the eastern Aegean that was once home to the ancient city of Kane (Canae).

Openstreetmap image showing the Garip Islands off the coast of Dikili, Turkey

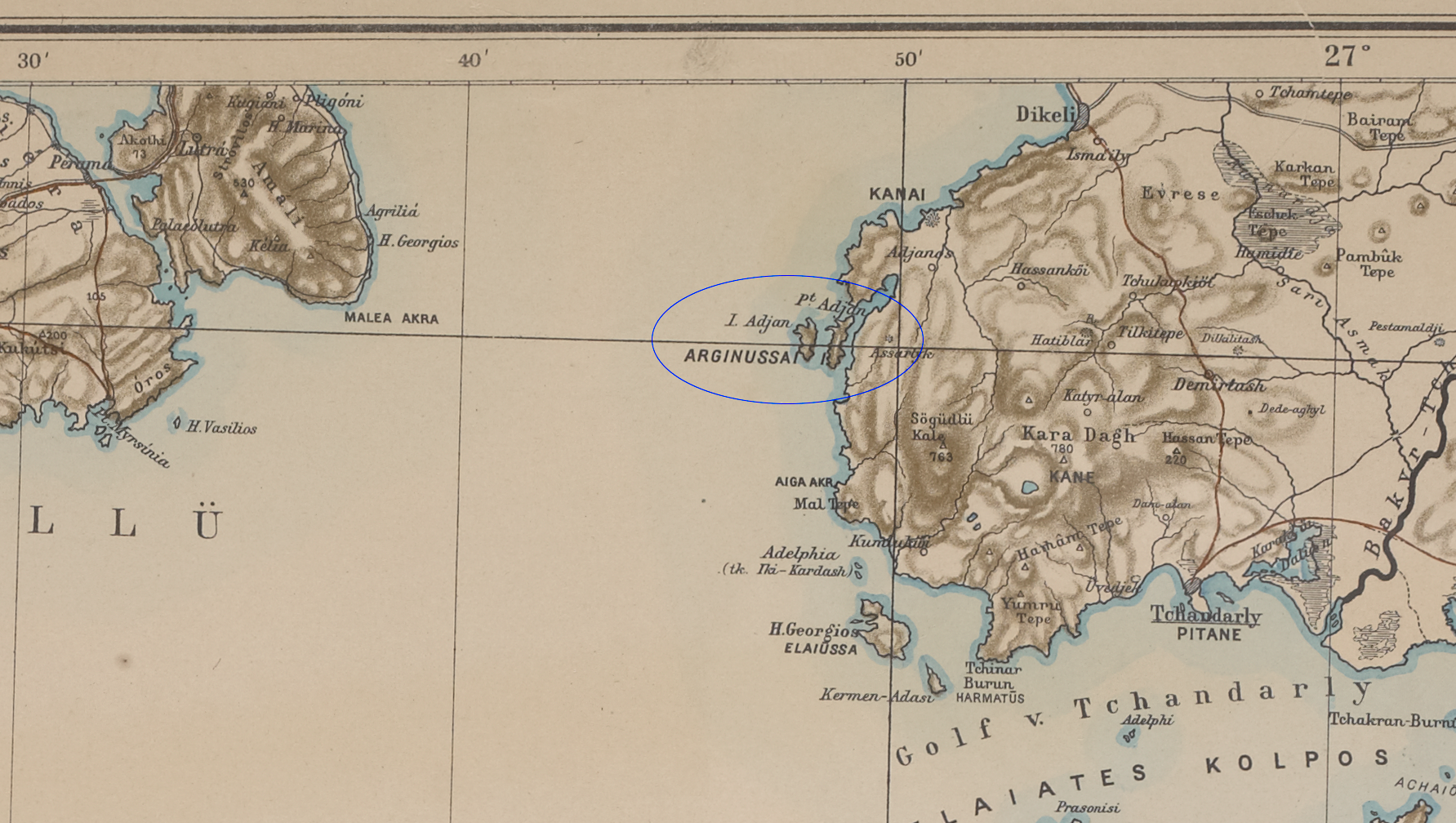
Highlighted map from 1890s indicating the Arginusae islands (now Garip Islands and Kalem Island). Original map by Heinrich Kiepert (1818–1899)

Approaching the Garip Islands in Turkey, by boat from the North West. The smaller island can be seen to the right, the larger island in the centre, and the mainland of Turkey is in the background on the left.

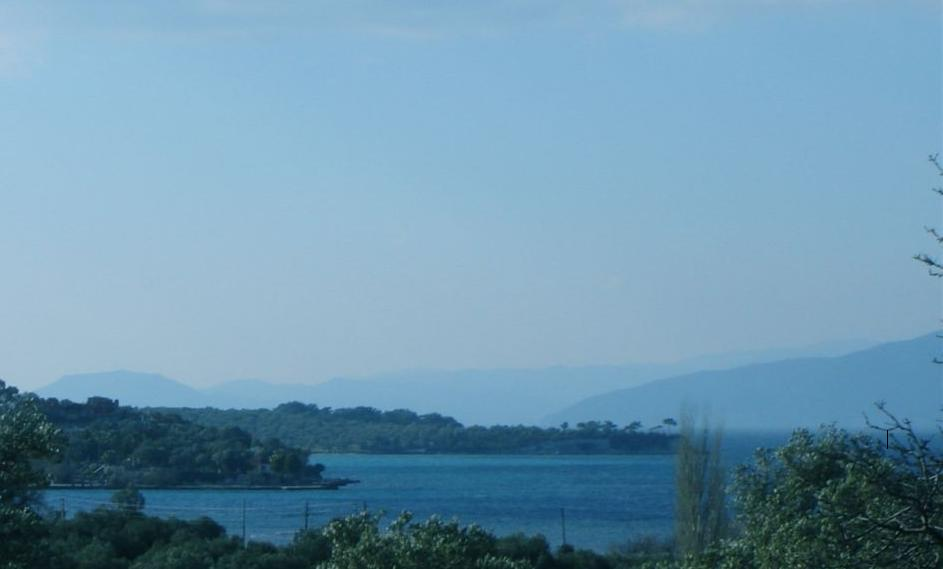
Dikili coastline with Garip Island in the background

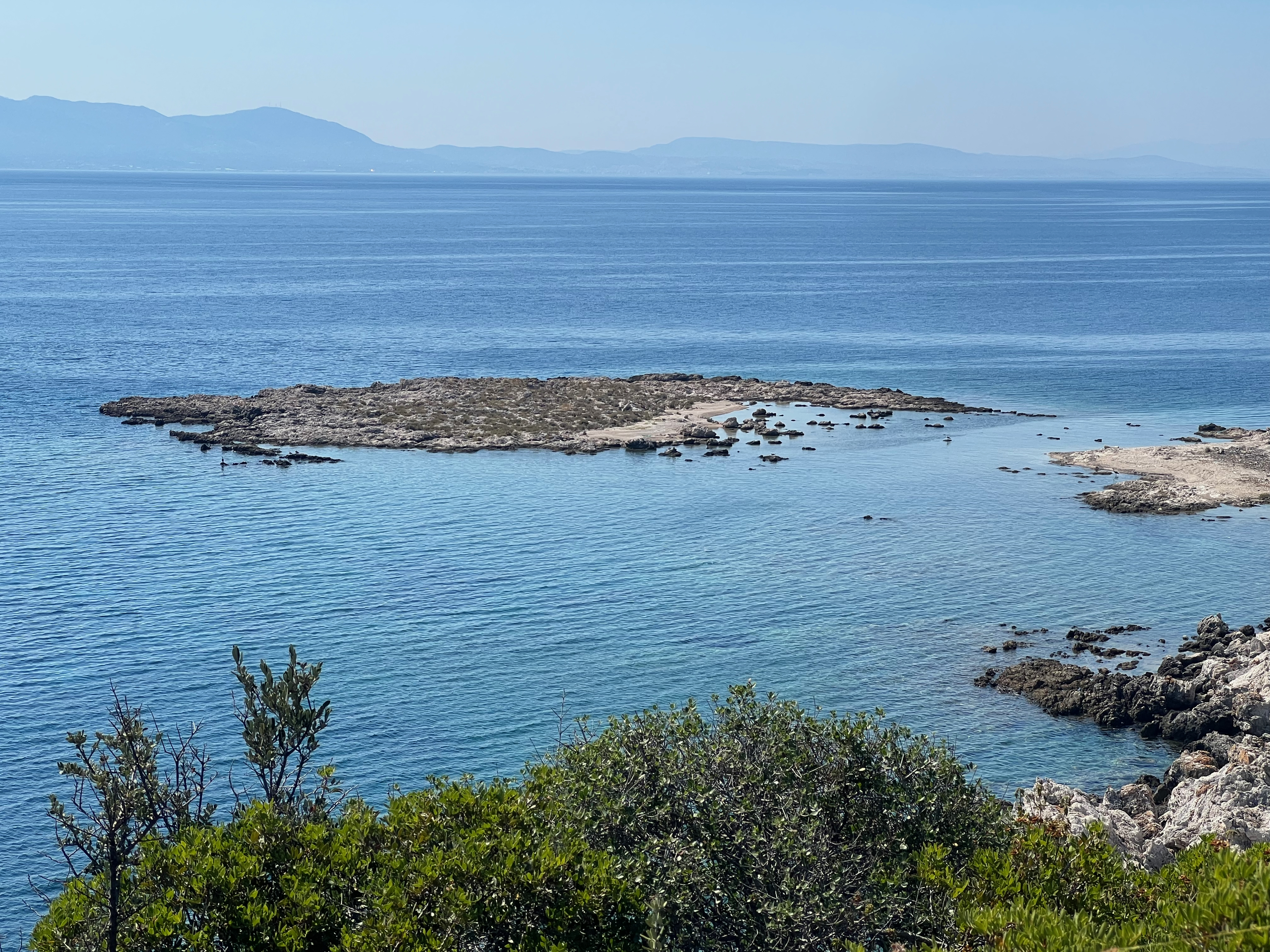
Smaller Garip Island viewed from the larger island with Lesbos in the distance

The view from Garip large island, looking out across the sea
