= Canae =

City in ancient Aeolis

Canae Κάναι
- Location within Turkey
- 39°2′19″N 26°48′53″E
- Location: Kane Promontory (Cane), Bademli, İzmir, Dikili District, Turkey

Site notes
- Discovered: 2015

Canae /ˈkeɪ.niː/ (Ancient Greek: Κάναι; Turkish: Kane) was, in classical antiquity, a city in ancient Aeolis, on the island of Argennusa in the Aegean Sea off the modern Dikili Peninsula on the coast of modern-day Turkey, near the modern village of Bademli. Today Argennusa has joined the mainland as the Kane Promontory off the Dikili Peninsula. Canae is famous as the site of the Battle of Arginusae in 406 B.C.

Canae is mentioned by the ancient writers Herodotus, Strabo, Pliny, Livy, Ptolemy, Sappho, Thucydides, and Mela.

== History ==
According to the first-century Greek geographer Strabo, Canae was founded by Locrians coming from Cynus in eastern Greece. Canae was built on the island of Argennusa (also spelt Arginusa), beside a small promontory hill variously called Mount Cane /ˈkeɪ.niː/ (Ancient Greek: Κάνη), Aega /ˈiːɡə/ (Αἰγᾶ), or Argennon /ɑːrˈdʒɛnən/ (Ἄργεννον). The name Canae (Κάναι) means "(city) of Mount Cane"; the district that included Argennusa and the neighboring two islands of Garip and Kalem was called Canaea.

According to the 5th-century B.C. Greek historian Herodotus, the massive Achaemenid army of Xerxes I passed Mount Cane on its way from Sardis to the Battle of Thermopylae in 480 B.C.

During the Peloponnesian War, an Athenian fleet commanded by eight strategoi unexpectedly defeated a Spartan fleet under Callicratidas off the coast of Canae in 406 B.C. in the Battle of Arginusae.

During the Roman–Seleucid War, fought between the Roman Republic and Antiochus the Great in 192–188 B.C., the Roman navy wintered in Canae on their way to Chios. Livy writes that "the ships were hauled on shore and surrounded with a trench and rampart."

By the time of Pliny the Elder in the first century A.D., the city was deserted.

== See also ==
- Arginusae
- Battle of Arginusae
- List of ancient Greek cities

== Classical sources ==
- Herodotus, The Histories
- Livy, The Foundation of the City
- Pliny the Elder, The Natural History
- Pomponius Mela, De situ orbis
- Ptolemy, Geography
- Sappho, quoted in Strabo (below)
- Stephanus of Byzantium, Ethnica
- Strabo, Geography
- Thucydides, History of the Peloponnesian War
