= Arginusae =

Three islands off the coast of Turkey in classical antiquity

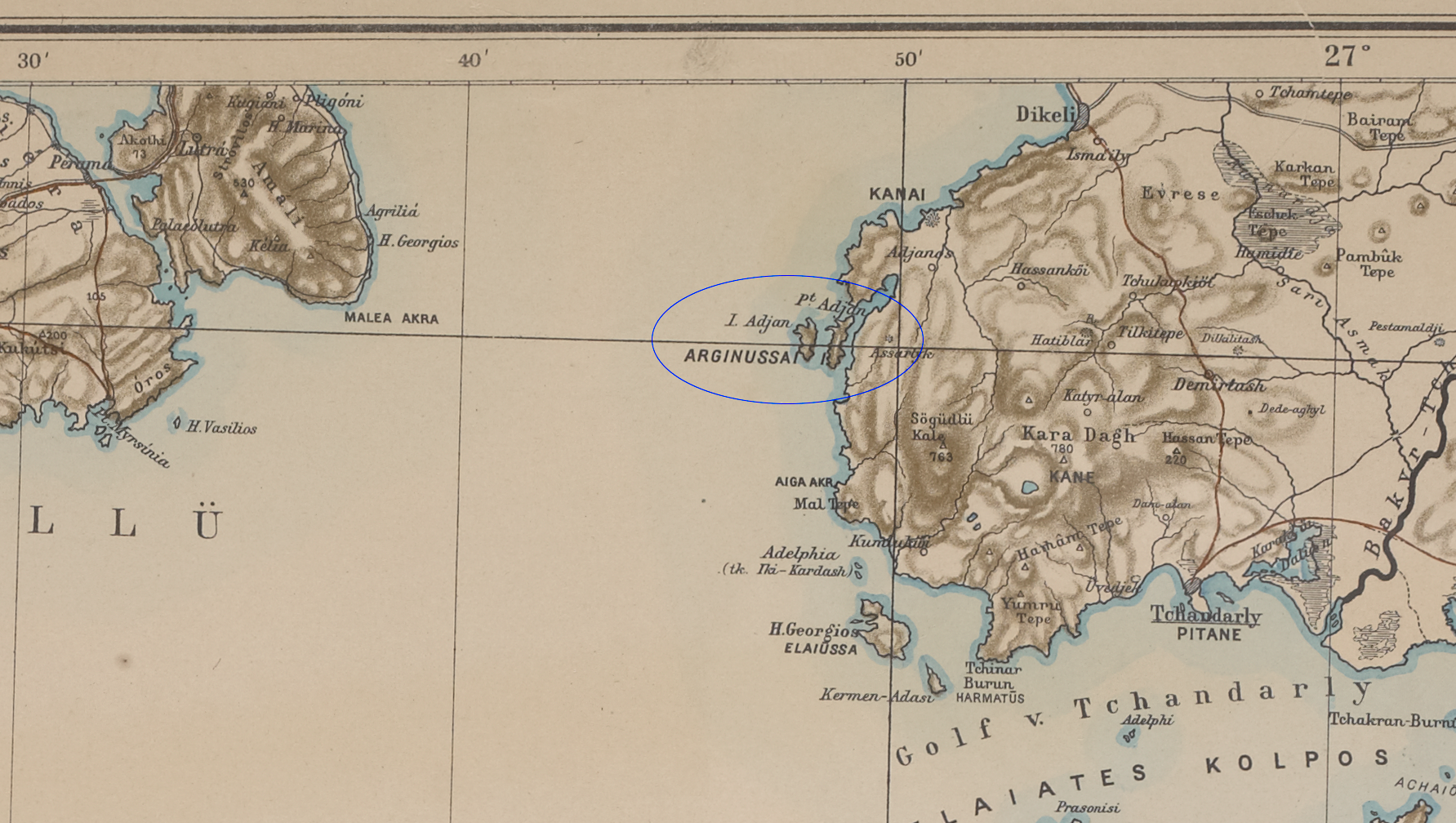
Highlighted map from 1890s indicating the Arginusae islands (now Garip Islands and Kalem Island). Original map by Heinrich Kiepert (1818–1899)

In classical antiquity, the Arginusae (Ancient Greek: Ἀργινοῦσαι Arginousai) were three islands off the Dikili Peninsula on the coast of modern-day Turkey, famous as the site of the Battle of Arginusae during the Peloponnesian War.

The Suda records a single island under the name Arginnousa (Ἀργίννουσα) and Stephanus of Byzantium likewise mentions Argennousa (Ἀργέννουσα). This may either reflect an error in the sources or refer to a distinct island whose location remains uncertain.

They took their names from a certain Arginos (Ἀργίνος). According to another theory, the names Arginusae and Argennusa derive from the Ancient Greek arginóeis and argennóeis (ἀργινόεις, ἀργεννόεις), "bright-shining".

They were also collectively referred to as Canaea after the city of Canae on the largest island.

Today two of the islands remain, while the third and largest has become attached to the mainland as a promontory near the modern village of Bademli:

- Baston Islands
  - Garip Island (Turkish: Garip Adası, literally "Strange Island"); Nisída Ázano
  - Kalem Island (Turkish: Kalem Adası, literally "Pen Island"); Nikolo, Vráchos Nikolós
  - Kane Peninsula or Promontory (Turkish: Kane Yarımadası), called Argennusa (Ancient Greek: Ἀργέννουσα; Latin: Arginusa) in antiquity, when it was an island; Canaea, Canae, Κάνη

Argennusa was the site of the ancient city of Canae.
