= Kabakum =

- Neighbourhood
- Location in Turkey Kabakum (İzmir)
- Coordinates: 39°08′N 26°54′E
- Country: Turkey
- Province: İzmir
- District: Dikili
- Elevation: 65 m (213 ft)
- Population (2022): 1,812
- Time zone: UTC+3 (TRT)
- Postal code: 35980
- Area code: 0232

Kabakum is a neighbourhood in the municipality and district of Dikili, İzmir Province, Turkey. Its population is 1,812 (2022). It is to the north of Dikili. Its distance to Dikili is 7 kilometres (4.3 mi) and to the Aegean coast is 3.5 kilometres (2.2 mi).
