= Efstratios Pelekidis =

Greek archaeologist and university teacher

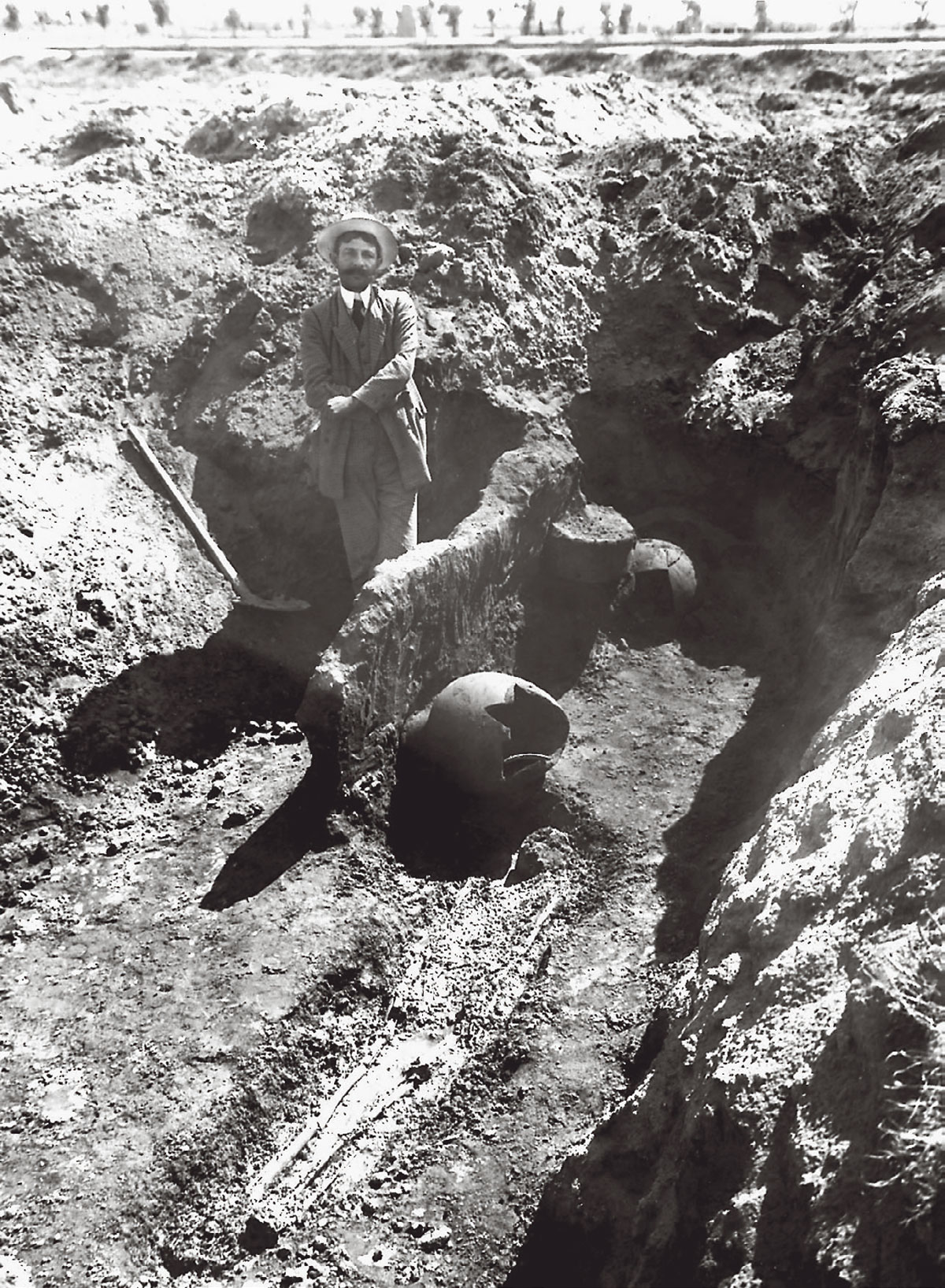
- Efstratios Pelekidis with some of his findings in 1915
- Born: 1880 or 1882; Dikili
- Died: 1958; Greece
- Education: University of Athens
- Occupations: Archaeologist, epigraphist teacher
- Employer(s): Archaeological Society of Athens and others

Efstratios (Stratis) Pelekidis (Greek: Ευστράτιος Πελεκίδης, 1880 or 1882-1958) was a Greek archaeologist and university teacher.

== Biography ==
He was born in 1880 or 1882 in Dikili of Asia Minor and studied archaeology initially in the University of Athens and later in Germany thanks to a grant from the Archaeological Society of Athens. He has served as a regent of antiquities found in the Macedonian region since 1914 and served as a teacher at the Mytilene Gymnasium, the Evangelical School of Smyrna and the Aristotle University of Thessaloniki where he taught the study of epigraphy.

As an archaeologist he collaborated during World War I with the archaeological service of the British army based in Thessaloniki and excavated in Paleo Faliro, where in 1915 he found skeletons of victims who had been buried, in Amphipolis, where in 1920 he excavated a Basilica and found a building of the Early Christian period, in Edessa during the period 1922-1923, in Chalkidiki and others.

He has also published several archaeological studies in journals and magazines such as the Archaeological Bulletin (Αρχαιολογικόν Δελτίον), the Proceedings of the Athens Archaeological Society (Πρακτικά της εν Aθήναις Aρχαιολογικής Eταιρείας) and others. According to the official website of the Greek Masonic Arcade, Pelekidis was also a mason. He died in 1958.
