= Cevizli, Kiraz =

Cevizli
- Neighbourhood
- Location in Turkey Cevizli (İzmir)
- Coordinates: 38.2329°N 28.4569°E
- Country: Turkey
- Province: İzmir
- District: Kiraz
- Established: 1603

Government
  - Muhtar: Cengiz Candan
- Area: 1.27 km^{2} (0.49 sq mi)
- Elevation: 100 m (330 ft)
- Population (2022): 1,331
  - Density: 1,050/km^{2} (2,710/sq mi)
- Time zone: UTC+3 (TRT)
- Postal code: 35890
- Area code: 0232

Cevizli is a neighbourhood in the municipality and district of Kiraz, İzmir Province, Turkey. Its population is 1,331 (2022). The village is very spread out, with an approximate area of 1.27 km^{2} (0.49 sq mi). Cevizli is geographically the easternmost settlement in the İzmir Province, located about 3 km (1.9 mi) west of the easternmost provincial border.
