= Karateke, Tire =

Karateke
- Neighbourhood
- Location of İzmir Province within Turkey

- Location of Karateke within İzmir Karateke (İzmir)
- Coordinates: 38°7′42.1392″N 27°40′30.7524″E
- Country: Turkey
- Province: İzmir
- District: Tire
- Population (2019): 504
- Time zone: UTC+3 (TRT)
- Postal code: 35900
- Area code: (+90) 232

Karateke is a neighbourhood in the municipality and district of Tire, İzmir Province in Turkey. Its population is 504 (2019).

== History ==
Karateke was formerly a village in terms of Administrative Division, but it became a neighborhood after the legal amendment in 2012.

== Population ==
Neighborhood population data by year

Year	Pop.	±%
2007	594	—
2008	605	+1.9%
2009	616	+1.8%
2010	628	+1.9%
2011	613	−2.4%
2012	559	−8.8%
2013	558	−0.2%

Year	Pop.	±%
2014	510	−8.6%
2015	505	−1.0%
2016	502	−0.6%
2017	502	+0.0%
2018	518	+3.2%
2019	504	−2.7%

Source: Türkiye İstatistik Kurumu
