= Esentepe, Dikili =

Esentepe
- Neighbourhood
- Location in Turkey Esentepe (İzmir)
- Coordinates: 39°01′N 26°55′E
- Country: Turkey
- Province: İzmir
- District: Dikili
- Elevation: 80 m (260 ft)
- Population (2022): 257
- Time zone: UTC+3 (TRT)
- Postal code: 35980
- Area code: 0232

Esentepe is a neighbourhood in the municipality and district of Dikili, İzmir Province, Turkey. Its population is 257 (2022). It is situated on the road connecting Dikili to Çandarlı. The distance to Dikili is 7 kilometres (4.3 mi) and to İzmir is 102 kilometres (63 mi).
