= Katıralanı =

- Neighbourhood
- Location in Turkey Katıralanı (İzmir)
- Coordinates: 39°00′N 26°53′E
- Country: Turkey
- Province: İzmir
- District: Dikili
- Elevation: 260 m (850 ft)
- Population (2022): 126
- Time zone: UTC+3 (TRT)
- Postal code: 35980
- Area code: 0232

Katıralanı is a neighbourhood in the municipality and district of Dikili, İzmir Province, Turkey. Its population is 126 (2022). It is situated to the south of Dikili.
