= Bahçeli, Dikili =

Bahçeli
- Neighbourhood
- Location in Turkey Bahçeli (İzmir)
- Coordinates: 39°12′25″N 26°49′08″E
- Country: Turkey
- Province: İzmir
- District: Dikili
- Elevation: 25 m (82 ft)
- Population (2022): 691
- Time zone: UTC+3 (TRT)
- Postal code: 35980
- Area code: 0232

Bahçeli is a neighbourhood in the municipality and district of Dikili, İzmir Province, Turkey. Its population is 691 (2022). It is situated on Turkish state highway D.550 at the Aegean Sea side.
