= Kocaoba, Dikili =

Kocaoba
- Neighbourhood
- Location in Turkey Kocaoba (İzmir)
- Coordinates: 39°06′0″N 26°58′26″E
- Country: Turkey
- Province: İzmir
- District: Dikili
- Elevation: 166 m (545 ft)
- Population (2022): 135
- Time zone: UTC+3 (TRT)
- Postal code: 35980
- Area code: 0232

Kocaoba is a neighbourhood in the municipality and district of Dikili, İzmir Province, Turkey. Its population is 135 (2022). It is to the east of Dikili. The distance to Aegean Sea coast is 8 kilometres (5.0 mi).
