= Nebiler, Dikili =

Nebiler
- Neighbourhood
- Location in Turkey Nebiler (İzmir)
- Coordinates: 39°10′N 26°54′E
- Country: Turkey
- Province: İzmir
- District: Dikili
- Elevation: 140 m (460 ft)
- Population (2022): 238
- Time zone: UTC+3 (TRT)
- Postal code: 35980
- Area code: 0232

Nebiler is a neighbourhood in the municipality and district of Dikili, İzmir Province, Turkey. Its population is 238 (2022). The village is situated to the east of Turkish state highway D.550.
