= Kızılçukur, Dikili =

Kızılçukur
- Neighbourhood
- Location in Turkey Kızılçukur (İzmir)
- Coordinates: 39°06′N 26°55′E
- Country: Turkey
- Province: İzmir
- District: Dikili
- Elevation: 25 m (82 ft)
- Population (2022): 222
- Time zone: UTC+3 (TRT)
- Postal code: 35980
- Area code: 0232

Kızılçukur is a neighbourhood in the municipality and district of Dikili, İzmir Province, Turkey. Its population is 222 (2022). It is situated to the east of Turkish state highway D.550.
