= Yaylayurt =

- Neighbourhood
- Location in Turkey Yaylayurt (İzmir)
- Coordinates: 38°58′N 26°55′E
- Country: Turkey
- Province: İzmir
- District: Dikili
- Elevation: 115 m (377 ft)
- Population (2022): 371
- Time zone: UTC+3 (TRT)
- Postal code: 35980
- Area code: 0232

Yaylayurt is a neighbourhood in the municipality and district of Dikili, İzmir Province, Turkey. Its population is 371 (2022). It is situated to the north of Gulf of Çandarlı. The distance to Dikili is 15 kilometres (9.3 mi) and to İzmir is 105 kilometres (65 mi).
