= Salihler, Dikili =

Salihler
- Neighbourhood
- Location in Turkey Salihler (İzmir)
- Coordinates: 39°11′02″N 26°51′07″E
- Country: Turkey
- Province: İzmir
- District: Dikili
- Elevation: 65 m (213 ft)
- Population (2022): 3,743
- Time zone: UTC+3 (TRT)
- Postal code: 35980
- Area code: 0232

Salihler is a neighbourhood in the municipality and district of Dikili, İzmir Province, Turkey. Its population is 3,743 (2022). It is at the north of Dikili. Distance to Dikili is 15 kilometres (9 mi) and to Aegean coast is 5.5 kilometres (3.4 mi).
