= Gökçeağıl =

- Neighbourhood
- Location in Turkey Gökçeağıl (İzmir)
- Coordinates: 39°10′N 26°53′E
- Country: Turkey
- Province: İzmir
- District: Dikili
- Elevation: 85 m (279 ft)
- Population (2022): 282
- Time zone: UTC+3 (TRT)
- Postal code: 35980
- Area code: 0232

Gökçeağıl is a neighbourhood in the municipality and district of Dikili, İzmir Province, Turkey. Its population is 282 (2022). It is situated to the east of Turkish highway D.550.
