= Denizköy, Dikili =

Denizköy
- Neighbourhood
- Location in Turkey Denizköy (İzmir)
- Coordinates: 38°57′N 26°49′E
- Country: Turkey
- Province: İzmir
- District: Dikili
- Elevation: 15 m (49 ft)
- Population (2022): 325
- Time zone: UTC+3 (TRT)
- Postal code: 35980
- Area code: 0232

Denizköy (literally "sea village") is a neighbourhood in the municipality and district of Dikili, İzmir Province, Turkey. Its population is 325 (2022). It is situated on the Aegean Sea side.
