= Çağlan =

- Neighbourhood
- Location in Turkey Çağlan (İzmir)
- Coordinates: 39°08′N 27°01′E
- Country: Turkey
- Province: İzmir
- District: Dikili
- Elevation: 220 m (720 ft)
- Population (2022): 113
- Time zone: UTC+3 (TRT)
- Postal code: 35980
- Area code: 0232

Çağlan is a neighbourhood in the municipality and district of Dikili, İzmir Province, Turkey. Its population is 113 (2022). It is situated in the western slopes of the mountainous area.
