= Poyracık =

- Neighbourhood
- Location in Turkey Poyracık (İzmir)
- Coordinates: 39°05′N 27°21′E
- Country: Turkey
- Province: İzmir
- District: Kınık
- Elevation: 60 m (200 ft)
- Population (2022): 5,990
- Time zone: UTC+3 (TRT)
- Postal code: 35990
- Area code: 0232

Poyracık is a neighbourhood in the municipality and district of Kınık, İzmir Province, Turkey. Its population is 5,990 (2022). Before the 2013 reorganisation, it was a town (belde). It is very close to Kınık. Distance to İzmir is about 140 kilometres (87 mi).

Poyracık is an old town and its history can be traced back to Gambrion of the 4th century BC. It was an important settlement during Pergamon state. In the middle age it became a part of Byzantine Empire. Sasa bey (a Turkmen bey of Aydınoğlu beylik) captured the town and finally it became a part of the Ottoman Empire. In 1937 it was declared a seat of township.
