= Kıroba =

- Neighbourhood
- Location in Turkey Kıroba (İzmir)
- Coordinates: 39°07′N 26°58′E
- Country: Turkey
- Province: İzmir
- District: Dikili
- Elevation: 110 m (360 ft)
- Population (2022): 49
- Time zone: UTC+3 (TRT)
- Postal code: 35980
- Area code: 0232

Kıroba is a neighbourhood in the municipality and district of Dikili, İzmir Province, Turkey. Its population is 49 (2022). It is situated to the north of Geyikli creek.
