= Demirtaş, Dikili =

Demirtaş
- Neighbourhood
- Location in Turkey Demirtaş (İzmir)
- Coordinates: 39°00′N 26°57′E
- Country: Turkey
- Province: İzmir
- District: Dikili
- Elevation: 75 m (246 ft)
- Population (2022): 267
- Time zone: UTC+3 (TRT)
- Postal code: 35980
- Area code: 0232

Demirtaş is a neighbourhood in the municipality and district of Dikili, İzmir Province, Turkey. Its population is 267 (2022). It is situated in the forests between Dikili and Çandarlı. The distance to Dikili is 10 kilometres (6.2 mi) and to İzmir is 98 kilometres (61 mi).
