= Angelos Simiriotis =

Greek poet and playwright

Angelos Simiriotis (Greek: Άγγελος Σημηριώτης; Dikili, 1873 – 1944) was a Greek poet, playwright, translator and educator.

== Sources ==
- Yanis Kordatos, Ιστορία της νεοελληνικής λογοτεχνίας, vol. 2, ed. Επικαιρότητα, Athens, 1983
- Tellos Agras, "Angelos Simiriotis", Νέα Εστία, vol. 18 τ.χ.211, (1 October 1935), p. 894-901
- Dimitrios Tsakonas, Λογοτεχνία και κοινωνία στο μεσοπόλεμο, ed. Κάκτος, Athens, 1987, p. 186-188
- ΕΚΕΒΙ
