= Samanlık, Dikili =

Samanlık
- Neighbourhood
- Location in Turkey Samanlık (İzmir)
- Coordinates: 39°07′N 27°01′E
- Country: Turkey
- Province: İzmir
- District: Dikili
- Elevation: 325 m (1,066 ft)
- Population (2022): 81
- Time zone: UTC+3 (TRT)
- Postal code: 35980
- Area code: 0232

Samanlık (also: Samanlıkköy) is a neighbourhood in the municipality and district of Dikili, İzmir Province, Turkey. Its population is 81 (2022).
