= Uzunburun =

- Neighbourhood
- Location in Turkey Uzunburun (İzmir)
- Coordinates: 39°01′N 26°54′E
- Country: Turkey
- Province: İzmir
- District: Dikili
- Elevation: 70 m (230 ft)
- Population (2022): 224
- Time zone: UTC+3 (TRT)
- Postal code: 35980
- Area code: 0232

Uzunburun is a neighbourhood in the municipality and district of Dikili, İzmir Province, Turkey. Its population is 224 (2022). It is situated to the east of Dikili.
