= Mazılı =

- Neighbourhood
- Location in Turkey Mazılı (İzmir)
- Coordinates: 39°07′37″N 26°58′12″E
- Country: Turkey
- Province: İzmir
- District: Dikili
- Elevation: 400 m (1,300 ft)
- Population (2022): 139
- Time zone: UTC+3 (TRT)
- Postal code: 35980
- Area code: 0232

Mazılı is a neighbourhood in the municipality and district of Dikili, İzmir Province, Turkey. Its population is 139 (2022). It is situated in the southern slopes of the mountainous area. Its distance to Dikili is 9 kilometres (5.6 mi) and to İzmir is 114 kilometres (71 mi).
