= Merdivenli =

- Neighbourhood
- Location in Turkey Merdivenli (İzmir)
- Coordinates: 38°59′N 26°51′E
- Country: Turkey
- Province: İzmir
- District: Dikili
- Elevation: 400 m (1,300 ft)
- Population (2022): 196
- Time zone: UTC+3 (TRT)
- Postal code: 35980
- Area code: 0232

Merdivenli is a neighbourhood in the municipality and district of Dikili, İzmir Province, Turkey. Its population is 196 (2022). It is situated to the south of Dikili.
