= Gambrium =

Ancient town in modern Turkey

Coordinates: 39°05′15″N 27°21′04″E

Gambrium or Gambrion (Ancient Greek: Γάμβριον and Γάμβρειον), also Gambreium or Gambreion (Γάμβρειον), was a town of ancient Aeolis and of Mysia, quite close to Pergamum. Its location is near Kınık and Bergama in İzmir province, in the Aegean Region of Turkey.

It is on a hill named Hisarlık in the Bakırçay (ancient Kaikos) valley and very close to modern town of Poyracık.

Gambrium is first mentioned in the Hellenica of Xenophon which gives knowledge about the region in 399 BCE. At that time the ruler of the city, as well as of Palaegambrium, was Gorgion, son of Gongylos.

There was a star with twelve rays on the electrum coins of Gambrium.
