= Kıratlı, Dikili =

Kıratlı
- Neighbourhood
- Location in Turkey Kıratlı (İzmir)
- Coordinates: 39°10′N 26°51′E
- Country: Turkey
- Province: İzmir
- District: Dikili
- Elevation: 55 m (180 ft)
- Population (2022): 678
- Time zone: UTC+3 (TRT)
- Postal code: 35980
- Area code: 0232

Kıratlı is a neighbourhood in the municipality and district of Dikili, İzmir Province, Turkey. Its population is 678 (2022). It is one of the northernmost villages of the district. It is situated to the east of Turkish state highway D.550 and Aegean Sea coast.
