= Deliktaş, Dikili =

Deliktaş
- Neighbourhood
- Location in Turkey Deliktaş (İzmir)
- Coordinates: 38°58′N 26°56′E
- Country: Turkey
- Province: İzmir
- District: Dikili
- Elevation: 70 m (230 ft)
- Population (2022): 1,488
- Time zone: UTC+3 (TRT)
- Postal code: 35980
- Area code: 0232

Deliktaş is a neighbourhood in the municipality and district of Dikili, İzmir Province, Turkey. Its population is 1,488 (2022). It is situated in the forests between Dikili and Çandarlı. The distance to Dikili is 12 kilometres (7.5 mi) and to İzmir is 97 kilometres (60 mi). The name of the village ("bored stone") refers to a 150 meter high boulder in the village. The village was founded in the 14th century during the Karesi Beylik era. The main economic activity is agriculture. Gumbo and olive are among the crops of the village. Some village residents work in transportation between İzmir and Dikili.
