= Yenice, Dikili =

Yenice
- Neighbourhood
- Location in Turkey Yenice (İzmir)
- Coordinates: 39°06′N 27°01′E
- Country: Turkey
- Province: İzmir
- District: Dikili
- Elevation: 210 m (690 ft)
- Population (2022): 80
- Time zone: UTC+3 (TRT)
- Postal code: 35980
- Area code: 0232

Yenice is a neighbourhood in the municipality and district of Dikili, İzmir Province, Turkey. Its population is 80 (2022). It is situated on the western slopes of the mountainous area.
