= Kiraz, İzmir =

Kiraz
- District and municipality
- Map showing Kiraz District in İzmir Province

- Location in Turkey Kiraz (İzmir)
- Coordinates: 38.2306°N 28.2044°E
- Country: Turkey
- Province: İzmir

Government
  - Mayor: Saliha Özçınar (AKP)
- Area: 573 km^{2} (221 sq mi)
- Population (2022): 43,510
  - Density: 75.9/km^{2} (197/sq mi)
- Time zone: UTC+3 (TRT)
- Postal code: 35980
- Area code: 0232
- Website: www.kiraz.bel.tr

Kiraz is a municipality and district of İzmir Province, Turkey. Its area is 573 km^{2}, and its population is 43,510 (2022). The town is approximately 148 km away from downtown İzmir.

== Composition ==
There are 56 neighbourhoods in Kiraz District:

- Ahmetler
- Akpınar
- Altınoluk
- Arkacılar
- Avunduruk
- Aydoğdu
- Bahçearası
- Başaran
- Çanakçı
- Çatak
- Çayağzı
- Ceritler
- Cevizli
- Çömlekçi
- Cumhuriyet
- Doğancılar
- Dokuzlar
- Emenler
- Gedik
- Haliller
- Hisarköy
- İğdeli
- İstiklal
- Kaleköy
- Karabağ
- Karabulu
- Karaburç
- Karaman
- Kibar
- Kırköy
- Mavidere
- Mersinlidere
- Olgunlar
- Örencik
- Örenköy
- Ovacık
- Pınarbaşı
- Saçlı
- Sarıkaya
- Sarısu
- Şemsiler
- Sırımlı
- Solaklar
- Suludere
- Taşlıyatak
- Tekbıçaklar
- Tombullar
- Umurcalı
- Umurlu
- Uzunköy
- Veliler
- Yağlar
- Yeni
- Yeniköy
- Yenişehir
- Yeşildere
