= Çukuralanı, Dikili =

Çukuralanı
- Neighbourhood
- Location in Turkey Çukuralanı (İzmir)
- Coordinates: 39°11′N 26°56′E
- Country: Turkey
- Province: İzmir
- District: Dikili
- Elevation: 560 m (1,840 ft)
- Population (2022): 105
- Time zone: UTC+3 (TRT)
- Postal code: 35980
- Area code: 0232

Çukuralanı is a neighbourhood in the municipality and district of Dikili, İzmir Province, Turkey. Its population is 105 (2022). It is situated in the western slopes of the mountainous area.
