= Kınık =

- District and municipality
- Map showing Kınık District in İzmir Province

- Location in Turkey Kınık (İzmir)
- Coordinates: 39°05′38″N 27°22′36″E
- Country: Turkey
- Province: İzmir

Government
  - Mayor: Sema Bodur (CHP)
- Area: 479 km^{2} (185 sq mi)
- Population (2022): 28,694
  - Density: 59.9/km^{2} (155/sq mi)
- Time zone: UTC+3 (TRT)
- Postal code: 35990
- Area code: 0232
- Website: www.kinik.bel.tr

Kınık (Turkish: [ˈkɯnɯk]) is a municipality and district of İzmir Province, Turkey. Its area is 479 km^{2}, and its population is 28,694 (2022).

== Composition ==
There are 37 neighbourhoods in Kınık District:

- Arpadere
- Arpaseki
- Aşağı
- Aziziye
- Bademalanı
- Bağalanı
- Balaban
- Büyükoba
- Çaltı
- Çanköy
- Çiftlikköy
- Cumalı
- Değirmencieli
- Dündarlı
- Elmadere
- Fatih
- Hamzahocalı
- İbrahimağa
- Işıklar
- Kalemköy
- Karadere
- Karatekeli
- Kocaömerli
- Kodukburun
- Köseler
- Mıstıklar
- Musacalı
- Örtülü
- DARMANCIK
- Poyracık
- Sucahlı
- Taştepe
- Türk
- Yayakent
- Yaylaköy
- Yeni
- Yukarı
