= Dikili =

- District and municipality
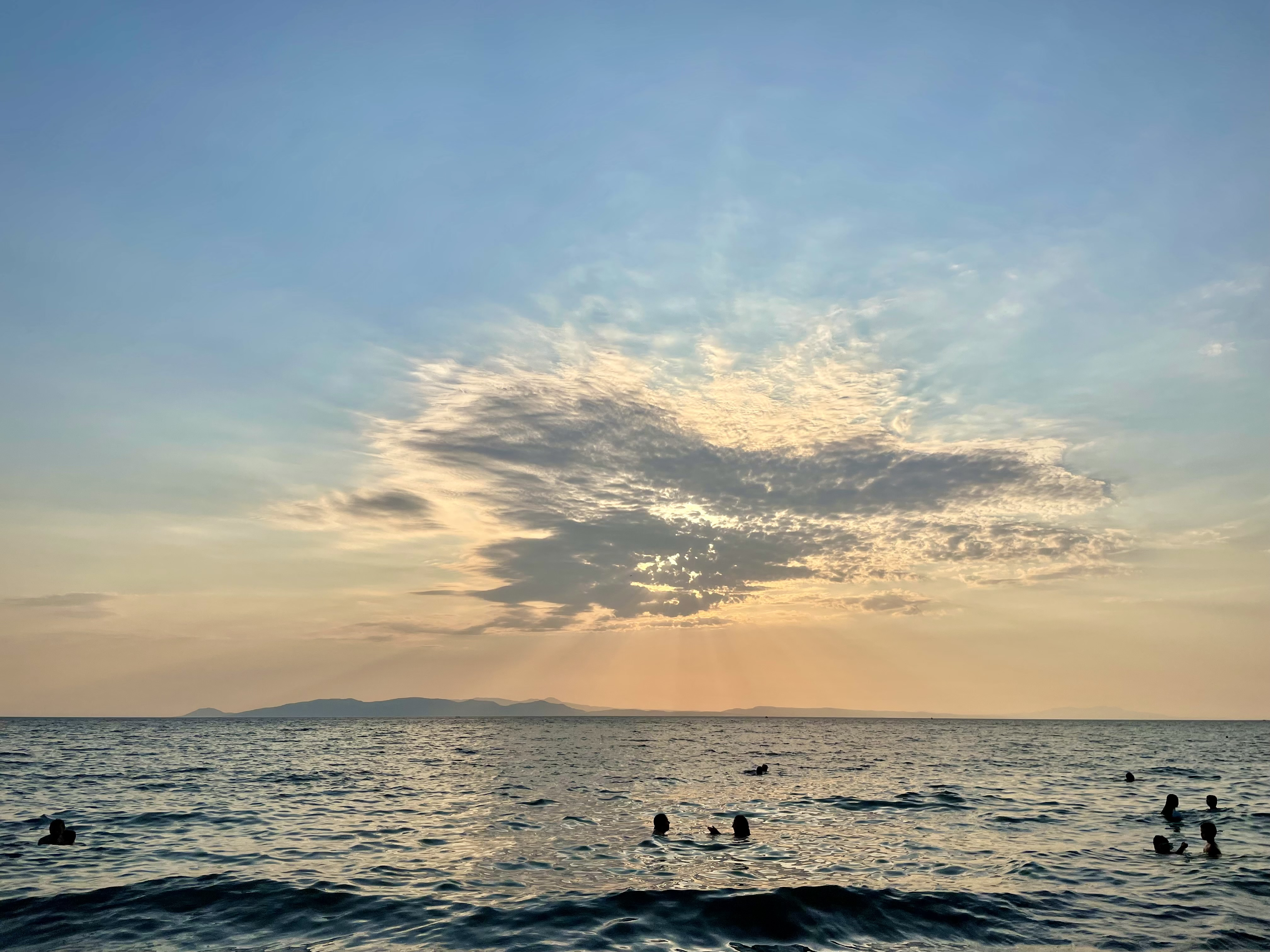
- Dikili beach looking towards Lesbos island

- Map showing Dikili District in İzmir Province

- Location within Turkey Location within İzmir
- Coordinates: 39°4′N 26°53′E
- Country: Turkey
- Province: İzmir

Government
  - Mayor: Adil Kırgöz (YENİ)
  - Kaymakam: Alper Faruk Güngör (kaymakam)
- Area: 534 km^{2} (206 sq mi)
- Elevation: 2–8 m (6.6–26.2 ft)
- Population (2025): 49,138
  - Density: 92.0/km^{2} (238/sq mi)
- Time zone: UTC+3 (TRT)
- Postal code: 35980
- Area code: 0232
- Website: www.izmir-dikili.bel.tr

Dikili is a municipality and district of İzmir Province, Turkey. Its area is 534 km^{2}, and its population is 49,138 (2025).

The district is quite picturesque both along its Aegean shoreline and in its inland parts, and is a popular summer resort. The central town of Dikili is about 120 km (75 mi) north of İzmir, served by a good road. The notable township of Çandarlı (ancient Pitane) is located close to Dikili.

== History ==
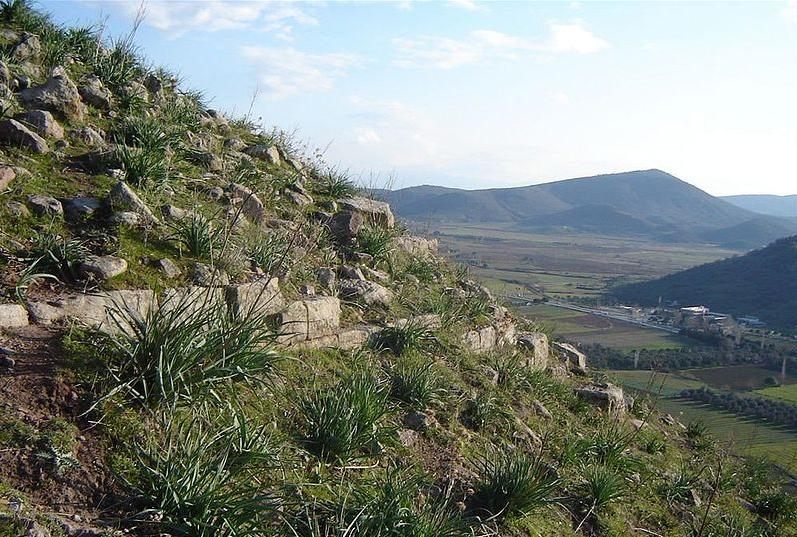
The ancient site of Atarna (Atarneus) and a view of the plain near Dikili

The ancient and as yet unexplored site of the ancient Greek city of Atarneus is located nearby. The site is called "Atarna" locally.

Dikili was under Greek military occupation from the 13th of June, 1919 to the 14th of September, 1922.

It was made into its own municipality on the 13th of October, 1928.

== Geography ==
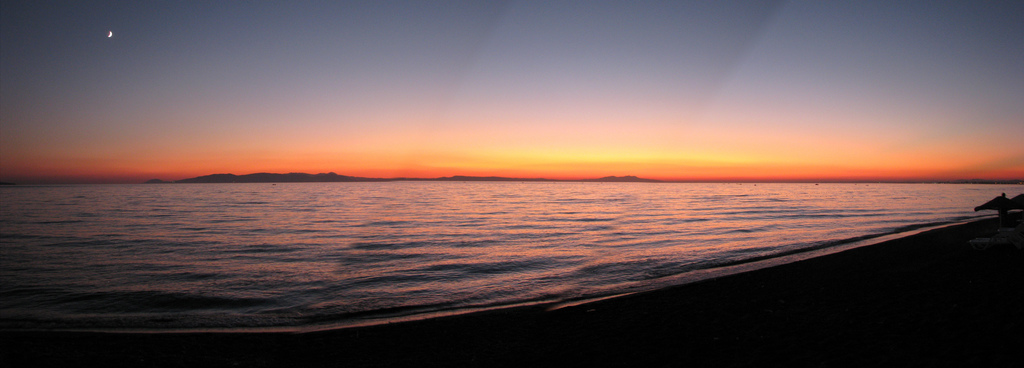
The island of Lesbos viewed from the coast of Dikili

Dikili town centre is situated opposite the Greek island of Lesbos. A small islet within Dikili district (called Garip Adası locally, with ancient sources also citing the name Argounissai) made international headlines in April 2007. The islet was offered for sale by its proprietors and The Guardian reported the Greek islanders of Lesbos were raising money among themselves for the $22m price tag to buy the islet.

=== Climate ===
Dikili has a hot-summer Mediterranean climate (Köppen: Csa), with hot, dry summers, and mild, moderately wet winters.

Climate data for Dikili (1991–2020)
Month	Jan	Feb	Mar	Apr	May	Jun	Jul	Aug	Sep	Oct	Nov	Dec	Year
Mean daily maximum °C (°F)	12.3 (54.1)	13.5 (56.3)	16.3 (61.3)	19.8 (67.6)	24.2 (75.6)	29.1 (84.4)	31.9 (89.4)	32.0 (89.6)	27.5 (81.5)	23.1 (73.6)	18.1 (64.6)	13.7 (56.7)	21.8 (71.2)
Daily mean °C (°F)	8.0 (46.4)	9.0 (48.2)	11.3 (52.3)	14.9 (58.8)	19.5 (67.1)	24.0 (75.2)	26.4 (79.5)	26.4 (79.5)	22.6 (72.7)	18.2 (64.8)	13.4 (56.1)	9.6 (49.3)	17.0 (62.6)
Mean daily minimum °C (°F)	4.7 (40.5)	5.3 (41.5)	7.1 (44.8)	10.4 (50.7)	15.1 (59.2)	19.3 (66.7)	21.7 (71.1)	21.8 (71.2)	18.1 (64.6)	14.2 (57.6)	9.8 (49.6)	6.4 (43.5)	12.9 (55.2)
Average precipitation mm (inches)	98.55 (3.88)	91.98 (3.62)	62.69 (2.47)	51.86 (2.04)	21.62 (0.85)	13.28 (0.52)	4.23 (0.17)	1.57 (0.06)	16.86 (0.66)	52.54 (2.07)	77.72 (3.06)	104.91 (4.13)	597.81 (23.54)
Average precipitation days (≥ 1.0 mm)	8.2	7.7	6.4	5.3	3.7	2.2	1.2	1	2.6	4.0	6.3	8.7	57.3
Average relative humidity (%)	72.9	71.6	69.6	69.3	67.5	63.6	60.8	62.5	66.2	71.3	72.5	73.7	68.4
Mean monthly sunshine hours	129.4	138.8	191.6	234.0	313.4	349.4	384.1	358.7	283.7	220.1	154.3	108.8	2,855.9
Source: NOAA

== Composition ==
There are 30 neighbourhoods in Dikili District:

- Bademli
- Bahçeli
- Çağlan
- Çandarlı
- Çukuralanı
- Cumhuriyet
- Deliktaş
- Demirtaş
- Denizköy
- Esentepe
- Gazipaşa
- Gökçeağıl
- İslamlar
- İsmetpaşa
- Kabakum
- Katıralanı
- Kıratlı
- Kıroba
- Kızılçukur
- Kocaoba
- Mazılı
- Merdivenli
- Nebiler
- Salihler
- Salimbey
- Samanlık
- Uzunburun
- Yahşibey
- Yaylayurt
- Yenice

== Important places ==
There is a crater lake in Merdivenli village, and ancient caverns in Demirtaş and Deliktaş villages, as well as pine forests extending towards the Madra Stream. There are thermal springs, which are in Nebiler, Bademli and Kocaoba villages. There are also beaches in Bademli and Denizköy. The Merkez Mosque is a rare example of a wooden construction dating from 1789. It was built without using any nails in the construction.

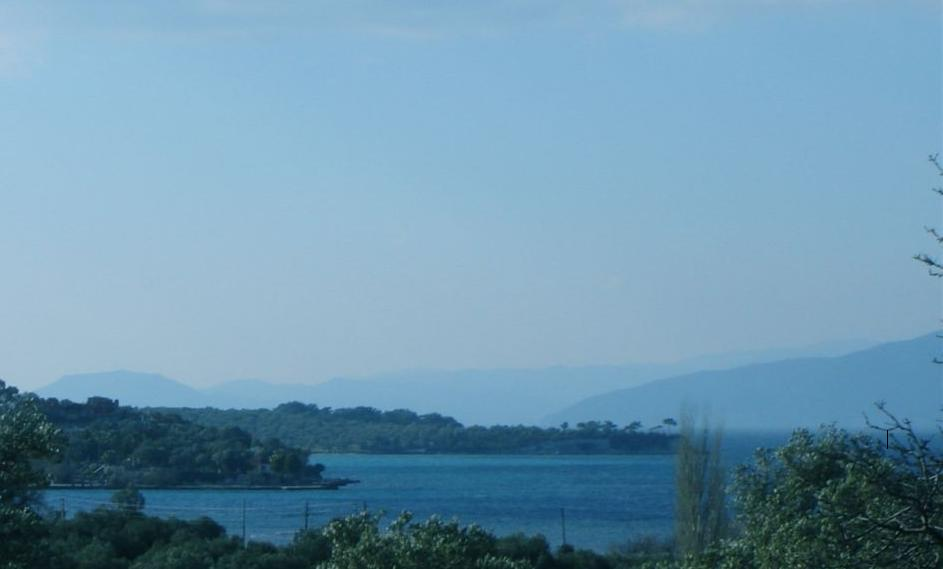
Dikili coastline with Garip Island recently offered for sale in the background

== Notable people ==
- Efstratios Pelekidis (1880/2–1958), Greek archaeologist and university professor
- Aristodimos Kaldis (1899–1979), Greek American artist and left-wing activist
- Angelos Simiriotis (1873–1944), Greek poet, playwright, translator and educator

== See also ==
- Atarneus
- Garip Island
