= Bademli, Dikili =

Bademli
- Neighbourhood
- Location in Turkey Bademli (İzmir)
- Coordinates: 39°1′40″N 26°49′27″E
- Country: Turkey
- Province: İzmir
- District: Dikili
- Elevation: 10 m (33 ft)
- Population (2022): 1,244
- Time zone: UTC+3 (TRT)
- Postal code: 35980
- Area code: 0232

Bademli is a neighbourhood in the municipality and district of Dikili, İzmir Province, Turkey. Its population is 1,244 (2022). Dikili is 7 kilometres (4 mi) to north. Aegean Sea coast is 1.3 kilometres (0.8 mi) to west.
