= İzmir Province =

Province of Turkey

İzmir Province İzmir ili
- Province
- Location of the province within Turkey
- Coordinates: 38°29′04″N 27°08′26″E
- Country: Turkey
- Seat: İzmir

Government
  - Vali: Cemil Tugay (CHP)
- Area: 11,891 km^{2} (4,591 sq mi)
- Population (2022): 4,462,056
  - Density: 375.25/km^{2} (971.88/sq mi)
- Time zone: UTC+3 (TRT)
- Area code: 0232
- Website: www.izmir.bel.tr www.izmir.gov.tr

İzmir Province (Turkish: İzmir ili) is a province and metropolitan municipality of Turkey in western Anatolia, situated along the Aegean coast. Its capital is the city of İzmir, which is in itself composed of the province's central 11 districts out of 30 in total. To the west, it is surrounded by the Aegean Sea, and it encloses the Gulf of Izmir. Its area is 11,891 square kilometres (4,591 square miles), and its population is 4,462,056 (2022). Neighboring provinces are Balıkesir to the north, Manisa to the east, and Aydın to the south. The traffic code of the province is 35. The current governor of the province is Süleyman Elban, appointed in August 2023.

Major rivers of the province include the Küçük Menderes river, Koca Çay (with Güzelhisar dam), and Bakırçay.

== History ==
It is one of the oldest cities and ports of ancient Ionia in the Mediterranean Sea. The original settlement was founded around 3000 BC, and the city has survived through different iterations to this day. It was inhabited by Greek populations from antiquity until the destruction of Smyrna in 1922 and the exchange of populations that followed with the Treaty of Lausanne. In its long history it has changed location twice.

The first location (prehistoric times) was mentioned by Strabo as "Old Smyrna" and the second location was built by Alexander the Great and his descendants (Hellenistic period). Ionians, in about 11th century BC, established the League of Ionia. It was later conquered by the Persians and retaken by the Greeks before being subsumed into the Roman Empire. In Roman times it became very prosperous and the Romans honored it three times with the praiseworthy title of "young girl" because of its amazing prosperity.

The term "Catholic Church" was first used in 110 in a letter from St. Ignatius of Antioch to the Church of Smyrna. After the split of the Roman Empire, the area became part of what is now called the Byzantine Empire until it was conquered by the Ottoman Turks in the 14th century. In 1424, Smyrna was conquered by the Ottomans. However, before and after its occupation, Venetians and Genoese tried several times to include it in their Republics.

On September 13, 1472, the Venetians, under Pietro Mocenigo, captured and destroyed the city, in a failed attempt. Following the First World War, the province was ceded to Greece, but was retaken by the forces of Mustafa Kemal Atatürk in the Turkish War of Independence.

As a result of the 1923 Treaty of Lausanne, all Greek Orthodox inhabitants of the province were deported, and İzmir Province was incorporated into the modern republic of Turkey.

An earthquake on 30 October 2020 killed 117 people in the area.

The 2025 Izmir wildfires began in June 2025 and continued into July, causing evacuation of over 50,000 people and large scale damages.

=== Archaeology ===
In January 2021, archaeologists headed by Elif Koparal, announced the discovery of the ruins of a 2500 year-old temple of Aphrodite from the 5th century BC in the Urla-Çeşme peninsula. Among other findings in and around the temple, they found a statue piece depicting a woman, a terracotta female head and an inscription that reads, "This is the sacred area". The traces of the temple were first excavated in 2016.

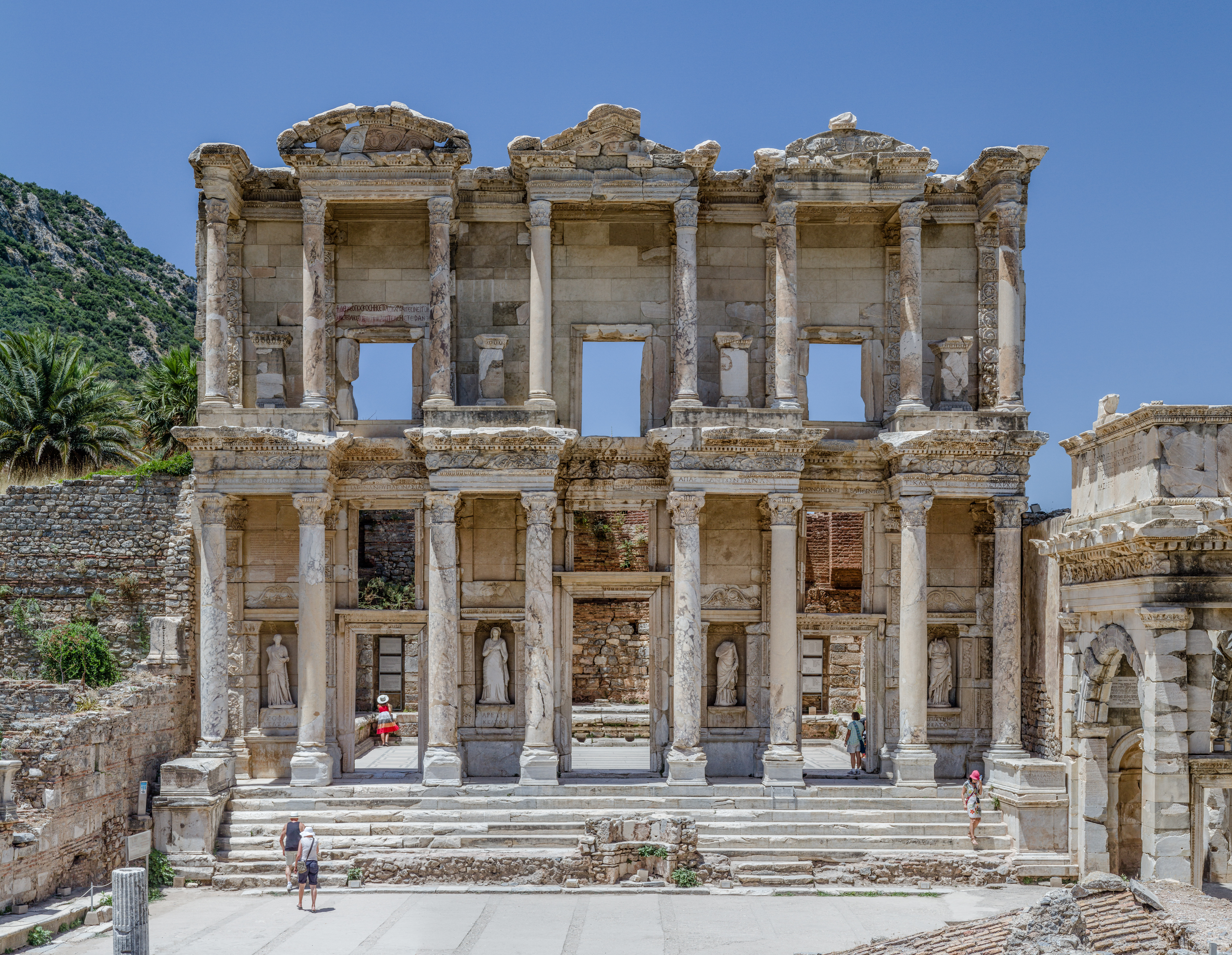
The ancient city of Ephesus is in the Province of İzmir

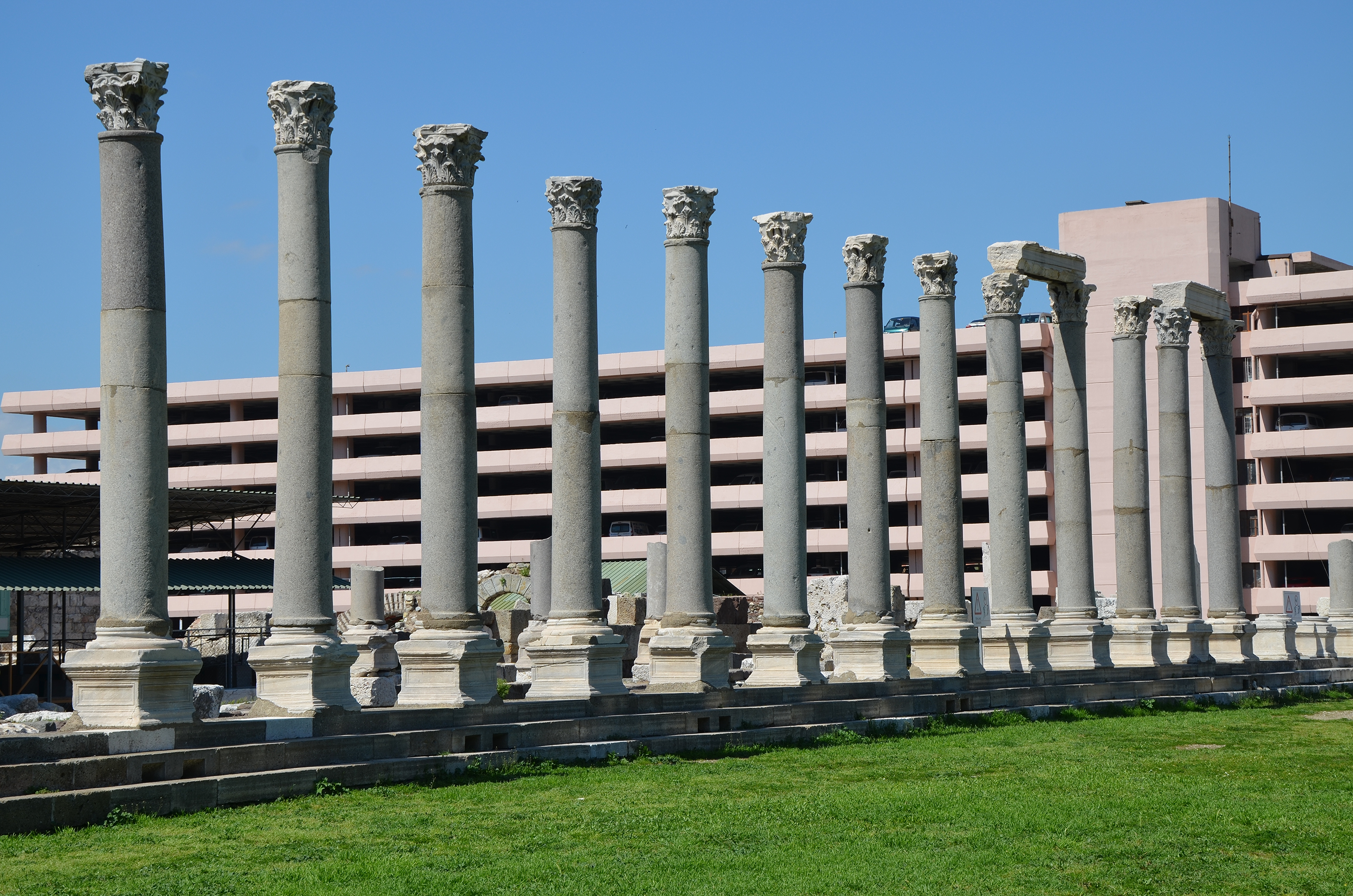
Agora of Smyrna

== Geography ==
=== Districts ===
- Aliağa
- Balçova
- Bayındır
- Bayraklı
- Bergama
- Beydağ
- Bornova
- Buca
- Çeşme
- Çiğli
- Dikili
- Foça
- Gaziemir
- Güzelbahçe
- Karabağlar
- Karaburun
- Karşıyaka
- Kemalpaşa
- Kınık
- Kiraz
- Konak
- Menderes
- Menemen
- Narlıdere
- Ödemiş
- Seferihisar
- Selçuk
- Tire
- Torbalı
- Urla
Districts of the İzmir Province

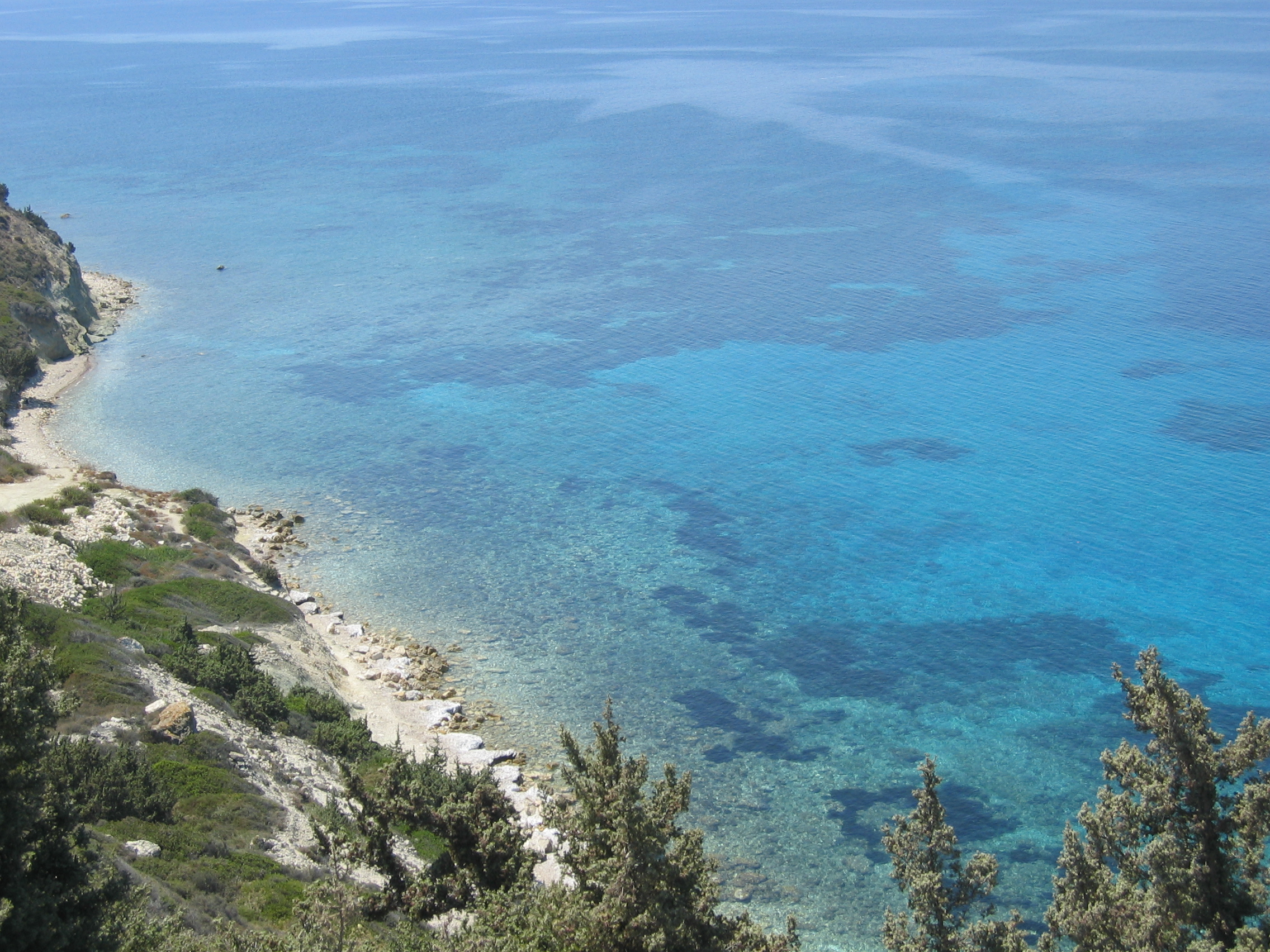
Çeşme is located in the province

== Demographics ==
Historical population
Year	Pop.	±% p.a.
1927	531,579	—
1935	596,850	+1.46%
1940	640,107	+1.41%
1950	768,411	+1.84%
1960	1,063,490	+3.30%
1970	1,427,173	+2.99%
1980	1,976,763	+3.31%
1990	2,694,770	+3.15%
2000	3,431,204	+2.45%
2010	3,948,848	+1.42%
2020	4,394,694	+1.08%
Source:Turkstat

== Wind power generation ==
"The greater Izmir region produces 20% of Turkey’s wind power from wind turbines capable of generating more than 1,300 megawatts (MW)."

== See also ==
- 2020 Aegean Sea earthquake
- List of populated places in İzmir Province
