= Christopolis =

Christopolis or Christoupolis (Greek: Χριστούπολις, "city of Christ") can refer to the following places and jurisdictions:

- Cristópolis, a municipality in the state of Bahia in Brazil
- Kavala, in Macedonia Secunda (now mainland Greece), known in Byzantine times as Christoupolis
- Birgi, now in Asian Turkey, known as Christoupolis in the 7th–12th centuries
- Monrovia, known as Christopolis in 1822–24, now capital of the West Africa nation of Liberia
