= Catolândia =

Municipality of Bahia, Brazil

- Municipality
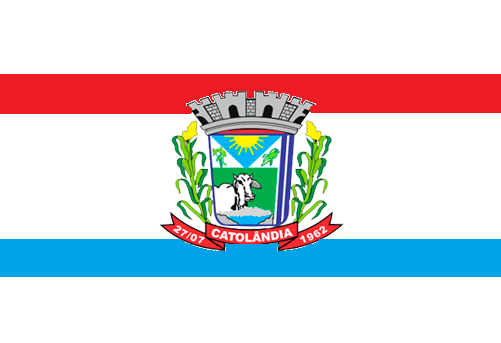
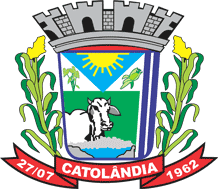
- Flag Coat of arms

- Location in Brazil
- Coordinates: 12°19′04″S 44°51′39″W
- Country: Brazil
- Region: Nordeste
- State: Bahia

Population (2022)
  - Total: 3,434
- Time zone: UTC−3 (BRT)

Catolândia is a municipality in the state of Bahia in the Northeast Region of Brazil. With an area of 702.504 square kilometers (271.238 sq mi), of which 0.6881 square kilometres (0.2657 sq mi) is urban, it is located 687 km from Salvador, the state capital, and 513 km from Brasília, the federal capital. Its population in the 2022 demographic census was 3,434 inhabitants, according to the Brazilian Institute of Geography and Statistics (IBGE), ranking as the least populous municipality in the state of Bahia.

== Geography ==
The territory of Catolândia covers 702.504 square kilometers (271.238 sq mi), of which 0.6881 square kilometres (0.2657 sq mi) constitutes the urban area. It sits at an average altitude of 596 meters above sea level. Catolândia borders these municipalities: Barreiras, São Desidério, Cristópolis, Baianópolis, and Angical. The city is located 687 km from the state capital Salvador, and 513 km from the federal capital Brasília.

Under the territorial division established in 2017 by the Brazilian Institute of Geography and Statistics (IBGE), the municipality belongs to the immediate geographical region of Barreiras, within the intermediate region of Barreiras. Previously, under the microregion and mesoregion divisions, it was part of the microregion of Barreiras in the mesoregion of Extremo Oeste Baiano.

== Demographics ==
In the 2022 census, the municipality had a population of 3,434 inhabitantes, ranking the lowest in the state, with 51.89% male and 48.11% female, resulting in a sex ratio of 107.87 (10,787 men for every 10,000 women), compared to 2,612 inhabitants in the 2010 census (37.02% living in the urban area), when it held the 417th state position. Between the 2010 and 2022 censuses, the population of Catolândia registered a growth of just over 31.5%, with an annual geometric growth rate of 0.34%. Regarding age group in the 2022 census, 63.23% of the inhabitants were between 15 and 64 years old, 22.69% were under fifteen, and 14.1% were 65 or older. The population density in 2022 was 4.89 inhabitants per square kilometer, with an average of 3.05 inhabitants per household.

The municipality's Human Development Index (HDI-M) is considered low, according to data from the United Nations Development Programme. According to the 2010 report published in 2013, its value was 0.582, ranking 241st in the state and 4,590th nationally (out of 5,565 municipalities), and the Gini coefficient rose from 0.35 in 2003 to 0.52 in 2010. Considering only the longevity index, its value is 0.786, the income index is 0.554, and the education index is 0.452.

== See also ==
- List of municipalities in Bahia
