= Selimiye Mosque, Edirne =

Mosque in Edirne, Turkey

Selimiye Mosque
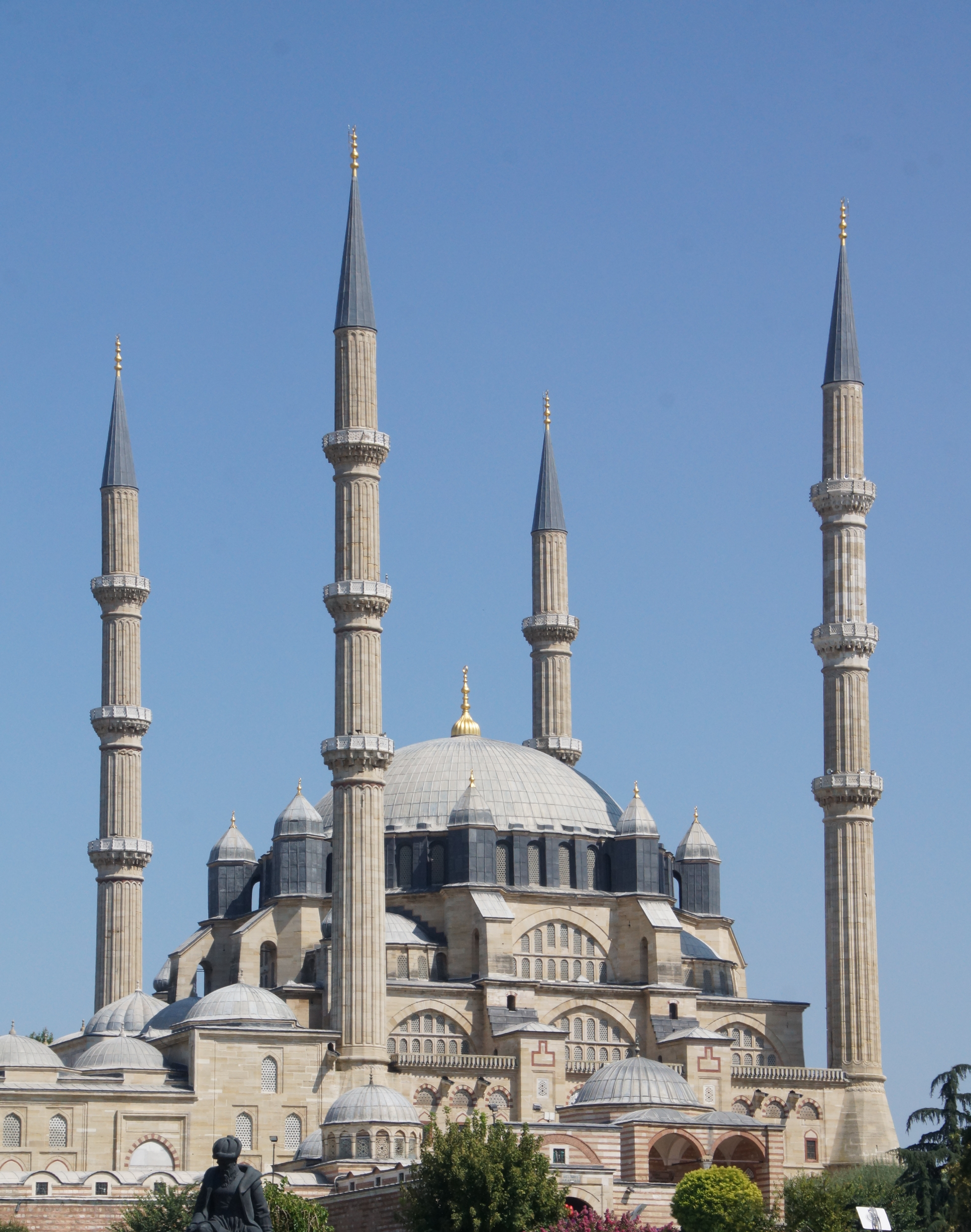

- Location of the mosque in Turkey.

Religion
- Affiliation: Sunni Islam

Location
- Location: Edirne, Turkey
- Coordinates: 41°40′41″N 26°33′34″E

Architecture
- Architect: Mimar Sinan
- Type: Mosque
- Style: Ottoman architecture (Classical)
- Groundbreaking: 1568
- Completed: 1574

Specifications
- Height (max): 43 m (141 ft)
- Dome dia. (outer): 31.2 m (102 ft)
- Minaret: 4
- Minaret height: 70.89 m (232.6 ft)
- Materials: cut stone, marble
- UNESCO World Heritage Site
- Official name: Selimiye Mosque and its Social Complex
- Type: Cultural
- Criteria: i, iv
- Designated: 2011 (35th session)
- Reference no.: 1366
- State Party: Turkey
- Continent: Europe

The Selimiye Mosque (Turkish: Selimiye Camii) is an Ottoman imperial mosque, located in the city of Edirne (formerly Adrianople), Turkey. It was commissioned by Sultan Selim II and was built by the imperial architect Mimar Sinan between 1568 and 1575. It was considered by Sinan to be his masterpiece and is one of the highest achievements of Islamic architecture as a whole and Ottoman architecture in particular. The mosque, together with its külliye, was included on UNESCO's World Heritage List in 2011.

== History ==
=== Construction ===
The Selimiye Mosque was built at the peak of Ottoman military and cultural power. Sultan Selim II, the son and successor of Suleiman the Magnificent, chose Edirne instead of Istanbul (the Ottoman capital) as the location to build his own sultanic mosque. The reasons for this decision are a matter of debate among historians. Selim II appeared to have a passion for the city, having served as its governor between 1548 and 1550, and he visited it frequently after becoming sultan. Edirne, a former Ottoman capital, was also one of the most important cities in the empire and a major stop on the imperial highway between Istanbul and the Balkan provinces. Other motivations may have included the fact that there were no more prominent hilltop sites in Istanbul available for the construction of an imperial mosque complex – at least not without resorting to mass expropriations. At the time of the mosque's commission, Selim II had also not commanded a victorious military campaign, which Islamic scholars of the time considered to be a requirement for building a sultanic mosque in Istanbul.

In March 1568, Selim II had asked Sinan to renovate the city's Old Mosque. Plans for a new imperial mosque, located on the hilltop above the Old Mosque, were probably begun around the same time. Construction on the mosque was begun in 1568 or 1569 (976 AH) and completed in 1574 or 1575 (982 AH). The mosque's construction and its waqf (charitable endowment) were ultimately funded with the help of the sultan's share of the spoils from the successful conquest of Cyprus, which was completed in 1571 with the surrender of Famagusta. Selim II died in December 1574, before he was able to see the mosque fully completed.

=== Later history ===
The mosque underwent its first repairs by Sinan in 1584, after minor damage caused by lightning. An earthquake in 1752 also caused minor damage. In 1808 some of the calligraphic decoration in the mosque was restored and a roof was added over the courtyard fountain, though it has since disappeared. During the reign of Abdülmecid I (1839–1861), the mosque's interior was re-plastered and its decoration redone, in a style partially imitating the former ornamentation.

In 1865, Baha'u'llah, the founder of the Baha'i Faith, arrived with his family to Edirne as a prisoner of the Ottoman Empire and resided in a house near Selimiye Mosque, which he visited often until 1868. It was at Selimiye mosque where he was supposed to have had an open debate with Mírzá Yaḥyá Núrí (also known by the title of Ṣubḥ-i-Azal), an important event in the split of Bábism, which ultimately resulted in the formation of the Baha'i Faith guided by Baha'u'llah and of Azalism guided by Mírzá Yaḥyá.

During the Russo-Turkish War of 1877–1878, some of the decorative tiles on the walls of the sultan's loge were looted and transferred to Moscow. During the siege of the city in 1913, the dome of the mosque was damaged by artillery fire. On the orders of Atatürk, traces of the damage were left unrestored, as a reminder and warning to future generations. Soon after, at the end of the Second Balkan War, some of the mosque's oldest carpets were stolen by retreating Bulgarian troops.

The mosque underwent restorations between 1954 and 1971, and some parts were also restored between 1982 and 1984. The mosque was depicted on the reverse of the Turkish 10,000 lira banknotes of 1982-1995. In late 2021 another comprehensive restoration project on the mosque began, scheduled to be completed by 2025.

== Architecture ==
=== The mosque ===
The mosque is widely regarded as Sinan's crowning masterpiece, and Sinan himself regarded it as his best work. The main building consists of two equal parts: a rectangular courtyard and a rectangular prayer hall, each measuring about 60 by 44 metres (197 by 144 ft).

==== Courtyard ====
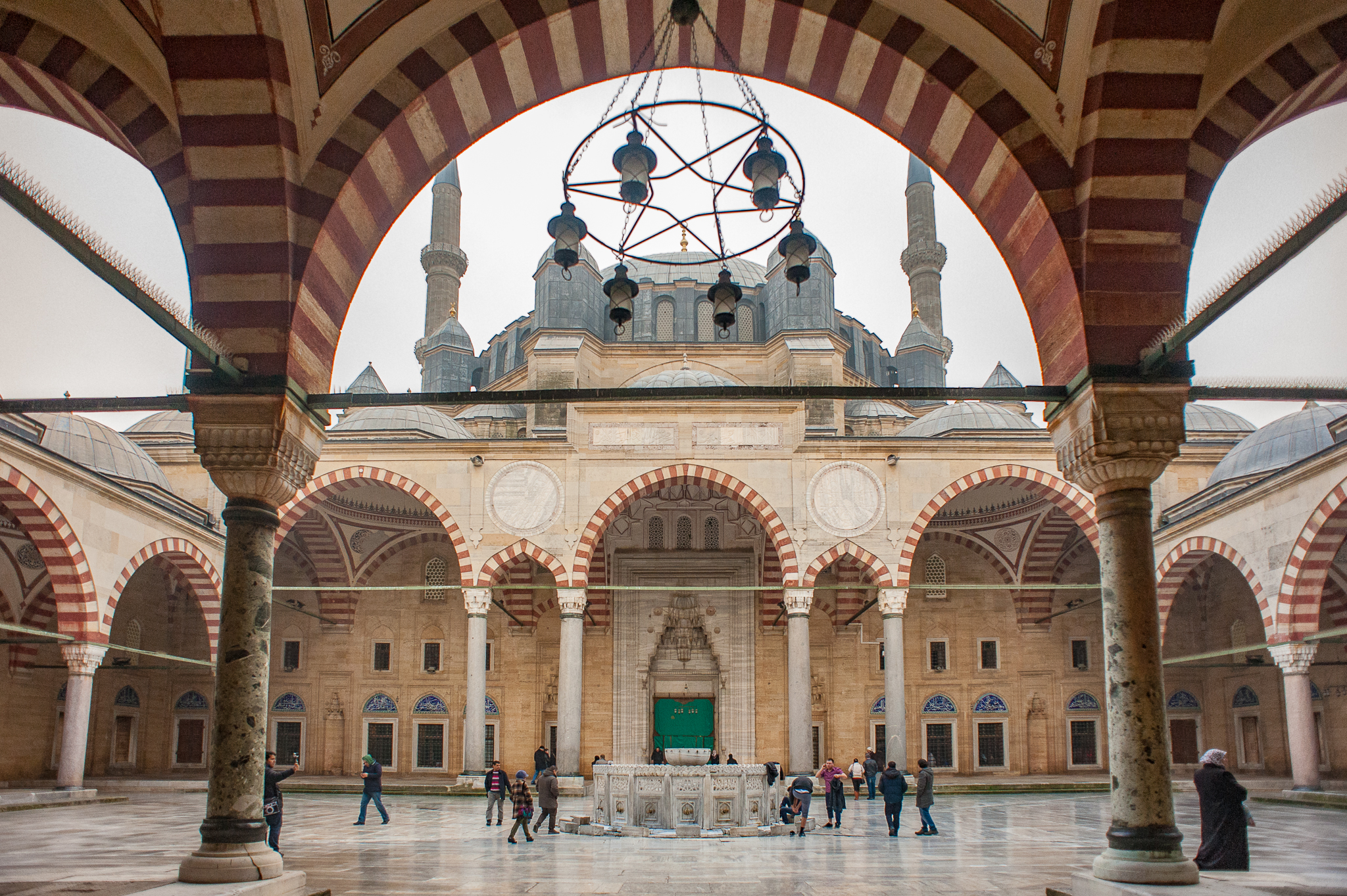
Courtyard of the mosque

The mosque's courtyard forms a dramatic approach that helps to frame the view of the main dome from outside. The central outer gate on the northwest side of the courtyard is unusually simple, as the customary muqarnas canopy is replaced by a simple round arch. Inside, the courtyard is surrounded by four porticos of arches and domes. The southeastern portico, immediately preceding the entrance to the prayer hall, is significantly taller than the other three porticos in order to match the great height of the mosque itself. This portico is composed of three wide arches with two very small arches between them, a configuration vaguely resembling a triumphal arch and very different from the earlier monumental portico designed by Sinan for the Süleymaniye Mosque. The façades above these arches are decorated with two marble circles inscribed with quotes from the Qur'an. The large lower windows around the courtyard are surmounted by decorative lunettes, except for the two windows on either side of the entrance portal, which are set below muqarnas niches instead. The lunettes of the windows on the prayer hall side are filled with Iznik tiles painted with calligraphy.

The marble shadirvan or ablutions fountain in the center of the courtyard, made of carved and pierced stone, is one of the finest examples of its kind from this period, but it lacks the usual roof and canopy. Doğan Kuban believes that this indicates it was never completed, while Gülru Necipoğlu states that this merely further emphasizes the view of the mosque's main dome above.

The entrance portal to the mosque's prayer hall has a more typical muqarnas canopy, while the dome covering the space in front of it is heavily fluted and decorated. The wooden doors of the entrance are said to have been taken from the Ulu Cami (Great Mosque) of Birgi.

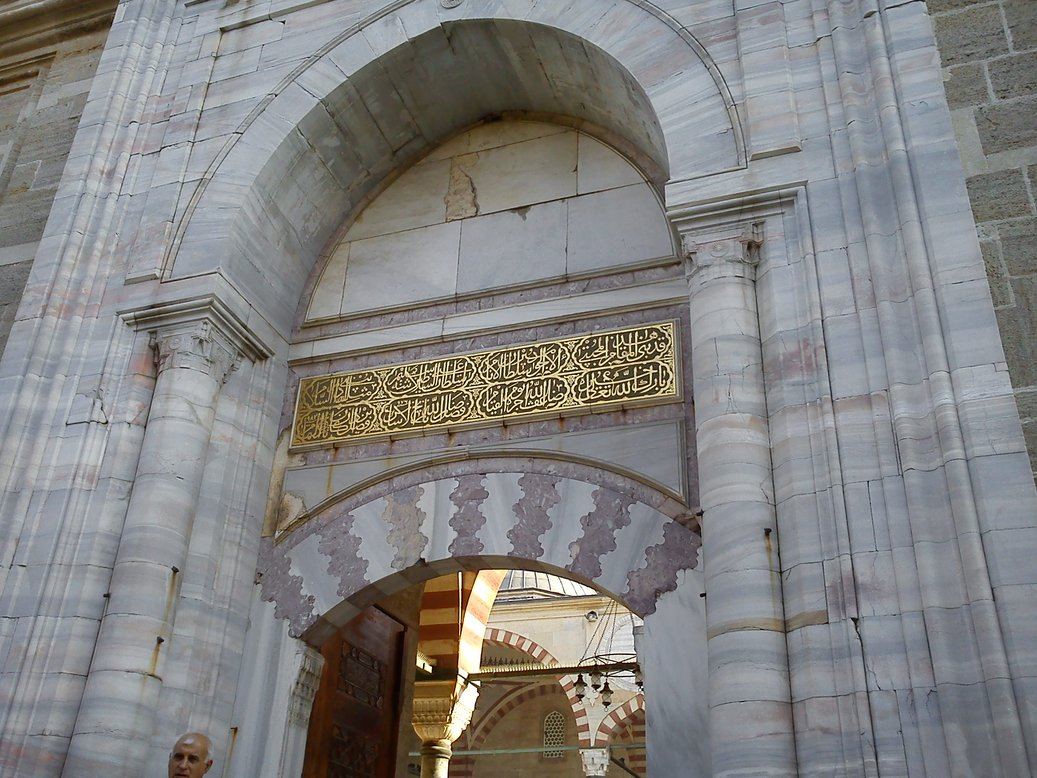
The central (northwestern) entrance portal to the courtyard

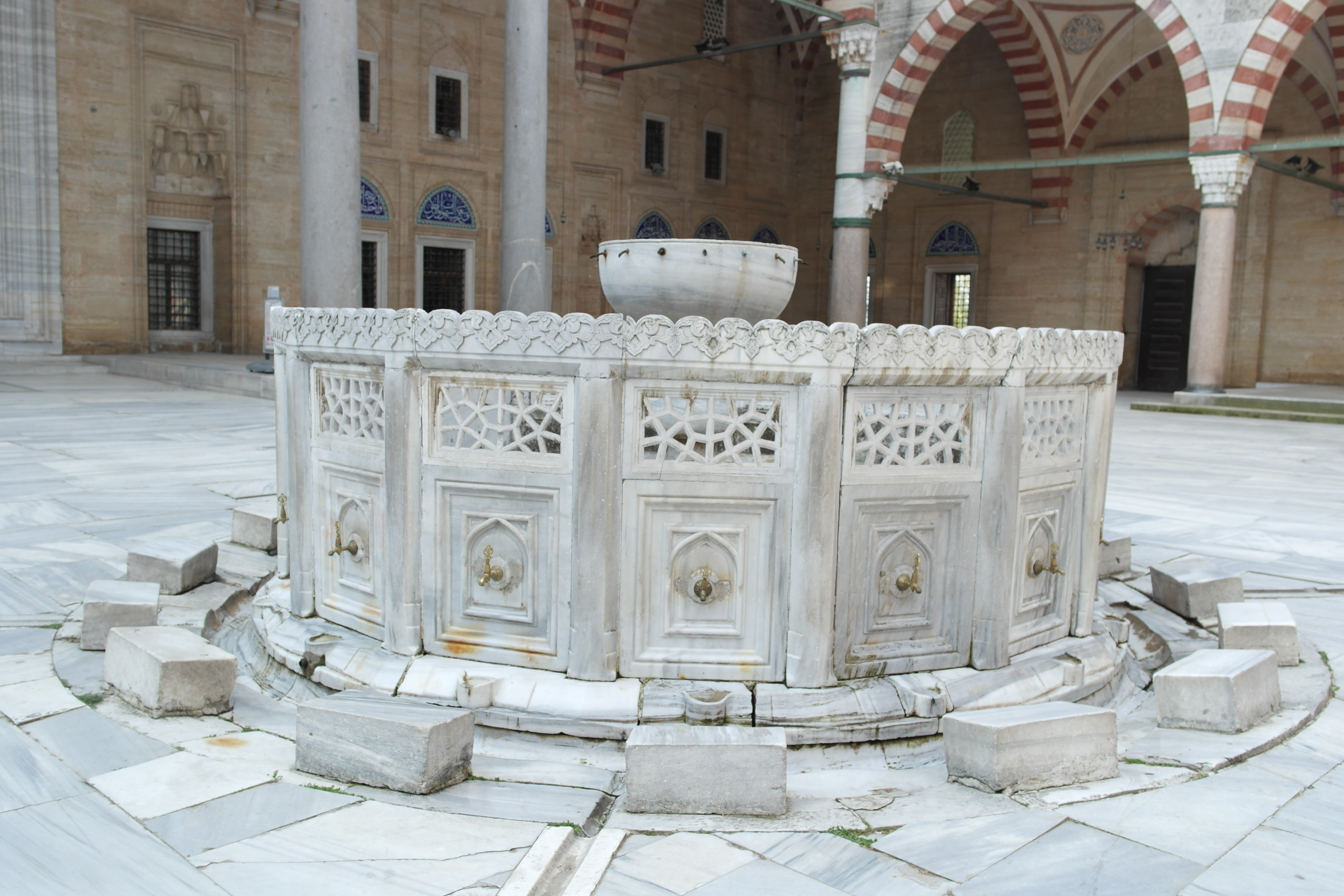
The shadirvan (fountain) of the courtyard

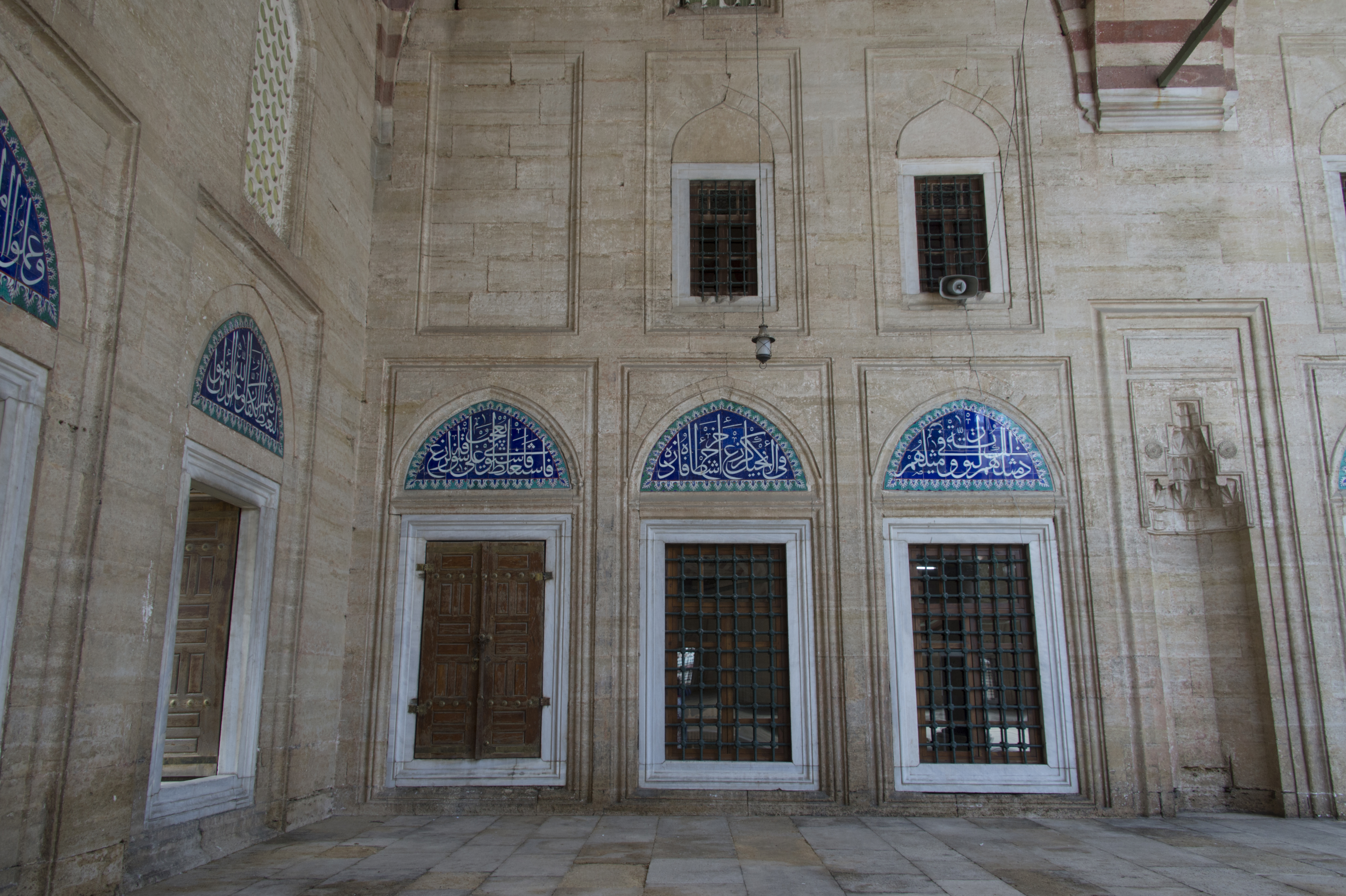
Windows with lunettes of Iznik tiles around the courtyard

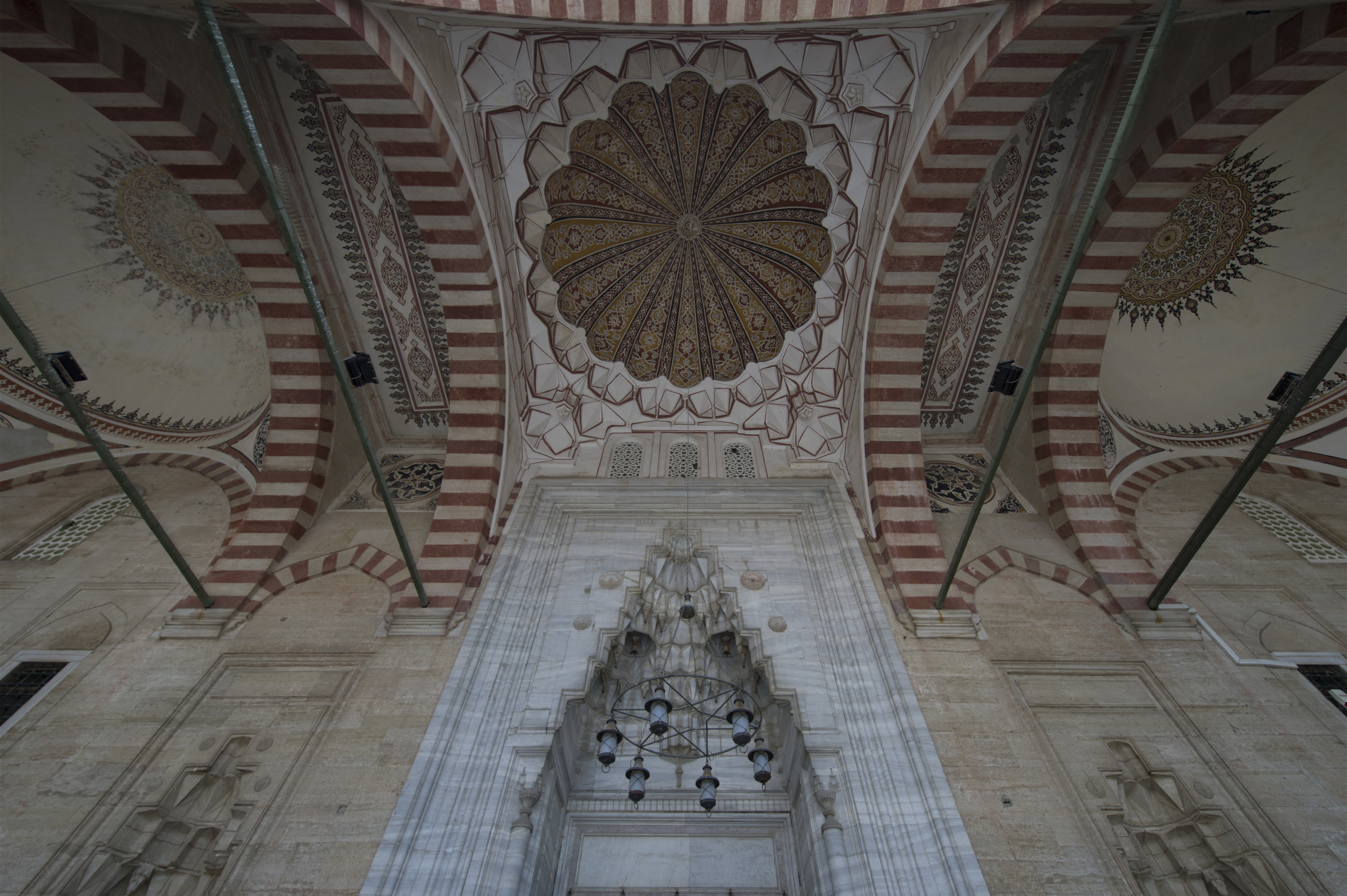
The decorative dome in front of the prayer hall entrance

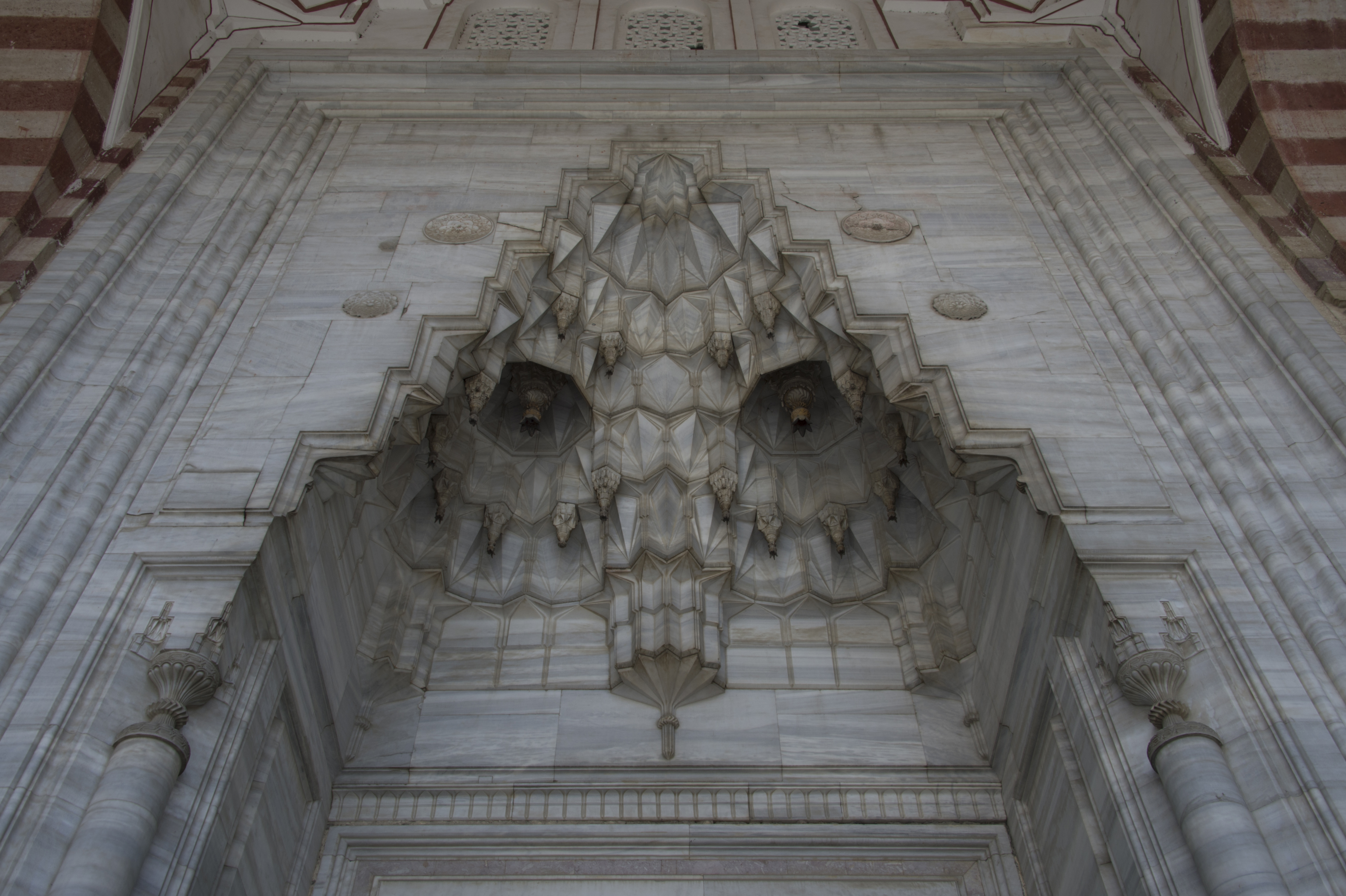
Muqarnas sculpting of the entrance portal of the prayer hall

==== Prayer hall and main dome ====
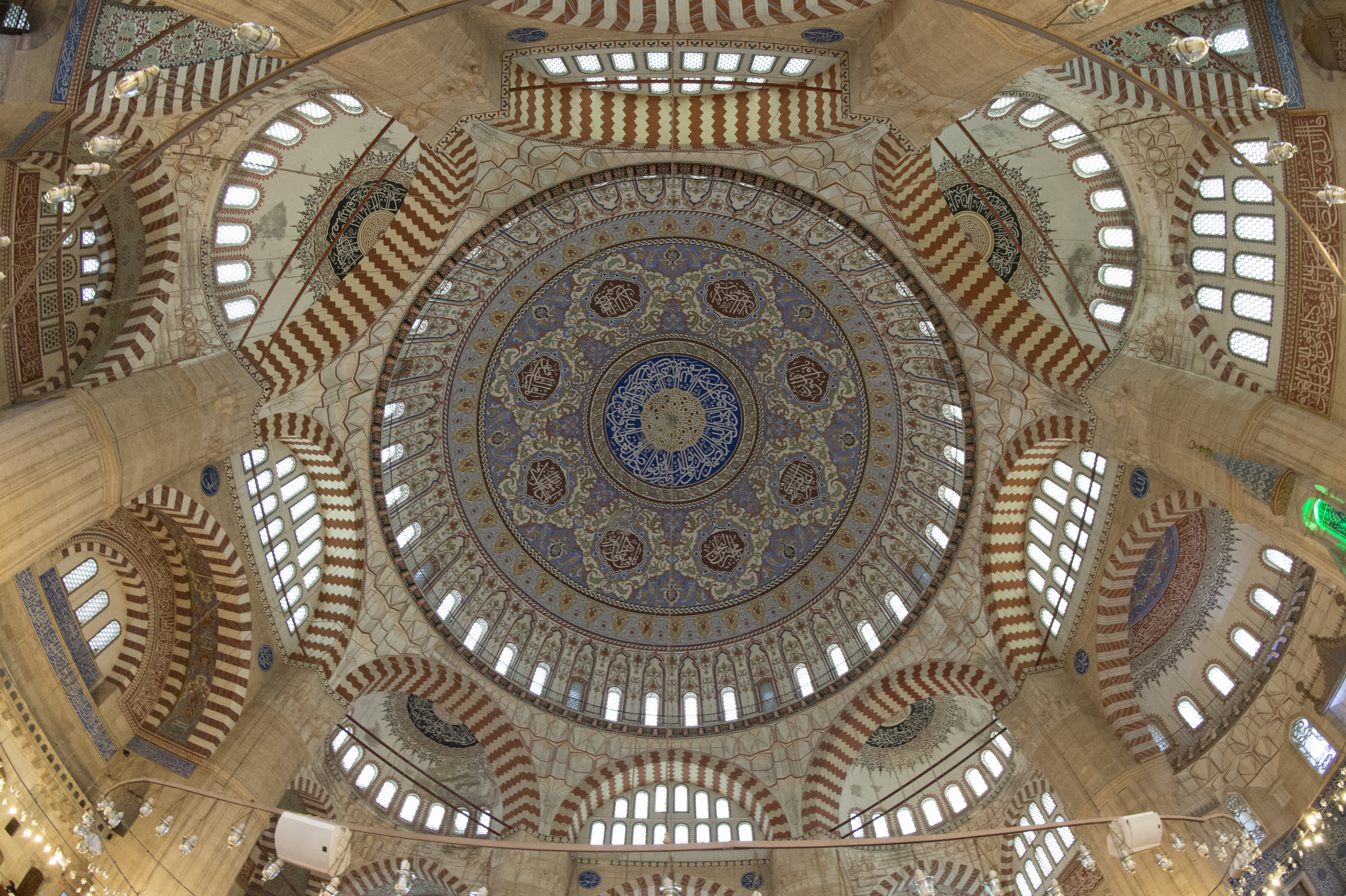
General view of the main dome and its supporting structures

The prayer hall's interior is notable for being completely dominated by a single massive dome, whose view is unimpeded by the structural elements seen in other large domed mosques before this. This design is the culmination of Sinan's spatial experiments, making use of the "octagonal baldaquin" design he had experimented with earlier. In this design the main dome is supported by a system of eight pillars incised in a rectangular shell of walls. This was the most effective available method of integrating the round dome with the rectangular hall below while minimizing the space occupied by the supporting elements of the dome.

The ingenuity of the mosque's design lies in the organization of its interior space. All of the architectural elements are subordinated to the huge central dome. The eight massive pillars are partly freestanding but closely integrated with the outer walls. Additional outer buttresses are concealed in the outer shell of the mosque, allowing the walls in between them to be pierced with a large number of windows. Four semi-domes at the corners, between the main pillars, are intermediary sections between the walls and the main dome. Compared to the semi-domes in some other Ottoman mosques, they are much smaller in relation to the main dome. Sinan also made good use of the spaces between the supporting pillars and buttresses by filling them with an elevated gallery inside the prayer hall, matched on the outside by arched porticos. The elevated galleries inside help to eliminate what little ground-level space exists beyond the central domed baldaquin structure, ensuring that the dome therefore dominated the view from anywhere a visitor could stand.

Another of Sinan's primary objectives was to surpass the size of the Hagia Sophia's central dome, allegedly motivated by Christian architects who claimed that Muslims were not capable of matching the construction of that dome. Sinan's biographies praise the dome of the Selimiye Mosque for its size and height, which is approximately the same diameter as the Hagia Sophia's main dome and slightly higher; the first time that this had been achieved in Ottoman architecture. The hemispherical dome has a diameter of 31.28 metres (102.6 ft). Its exact height is sometimes disputed but is approximately 42 metres (138 ft). In the Tezkiratü'l-Bünyan, the biography written by Sa'i Mustafa Çelebi, Sinan is said to declare: "In this mosque...I [have] erected a dome six cubits higher and four cubits wider than the dome of Hagia Sophia."

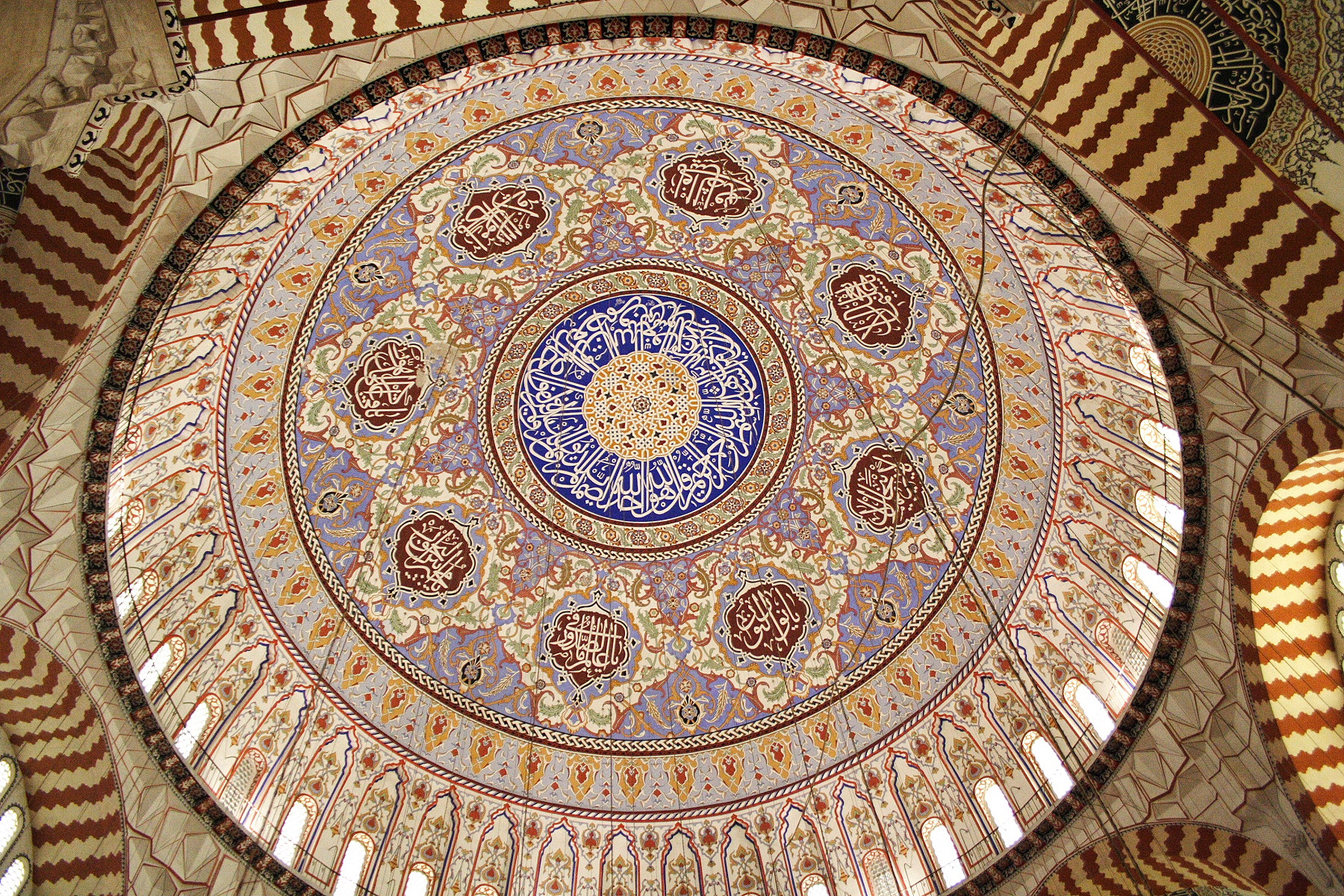
Closer view of central dome

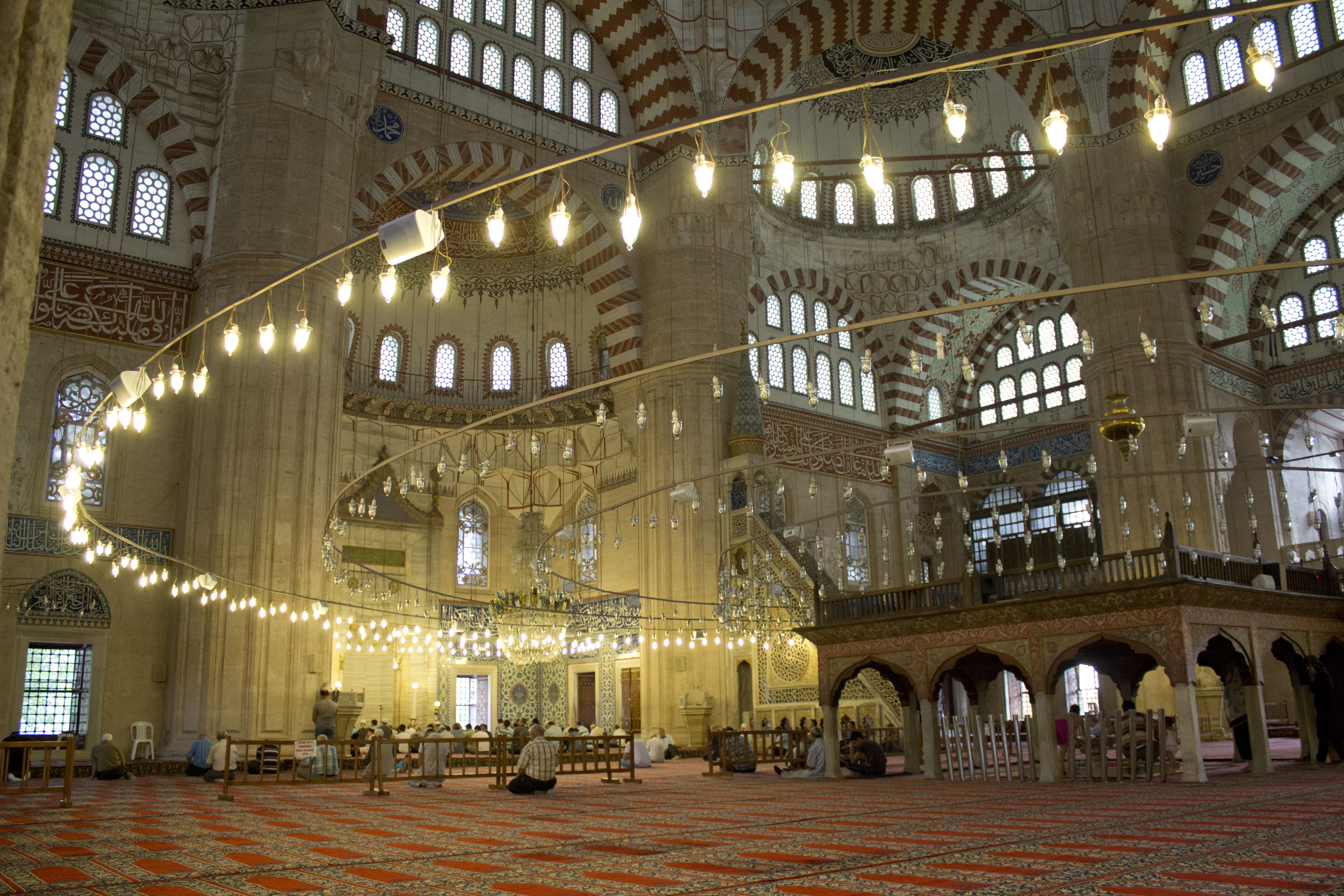
General view of the interior

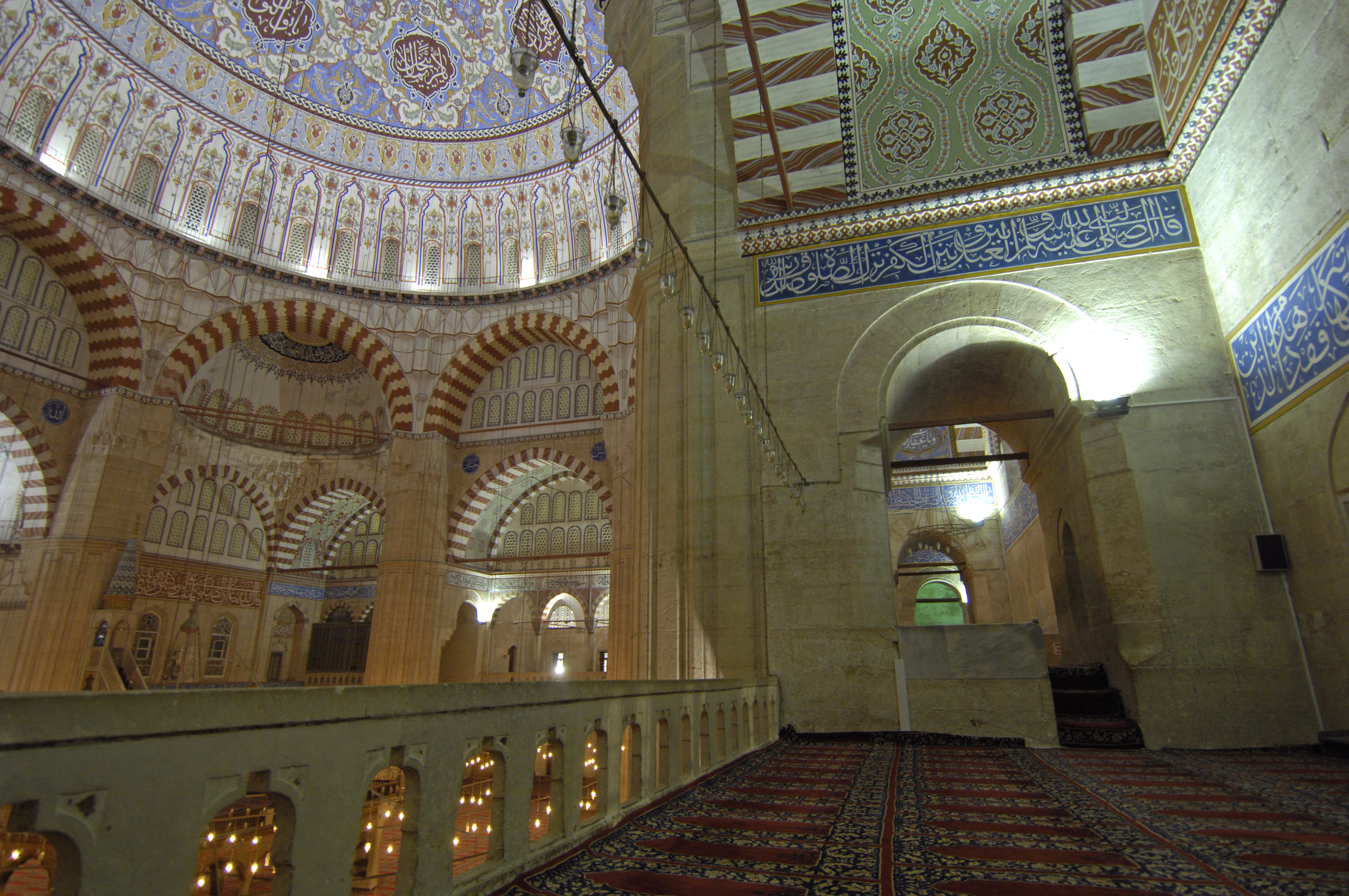
The upper-floor gallery

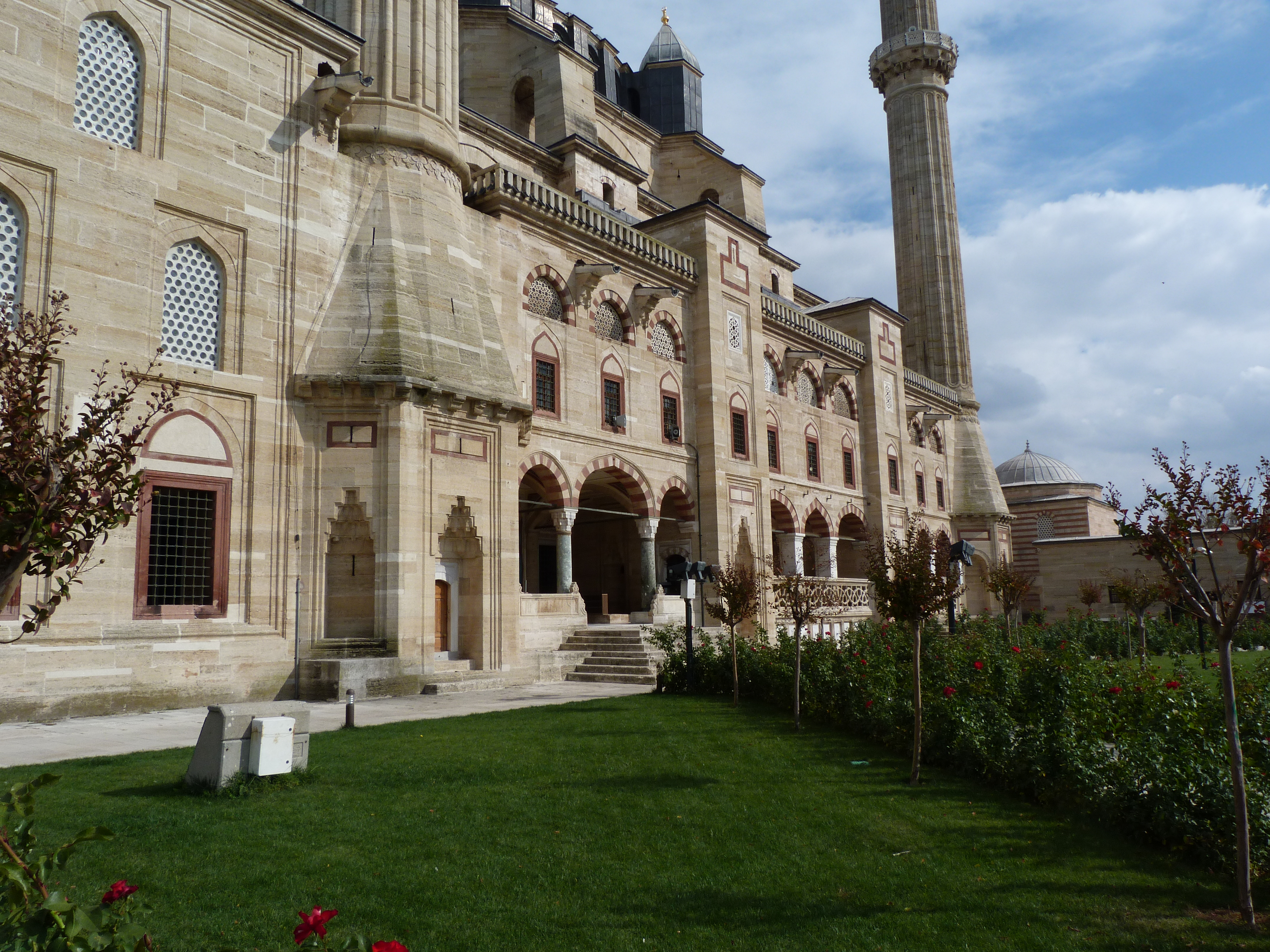
Exterior view of the lower walls and porticos

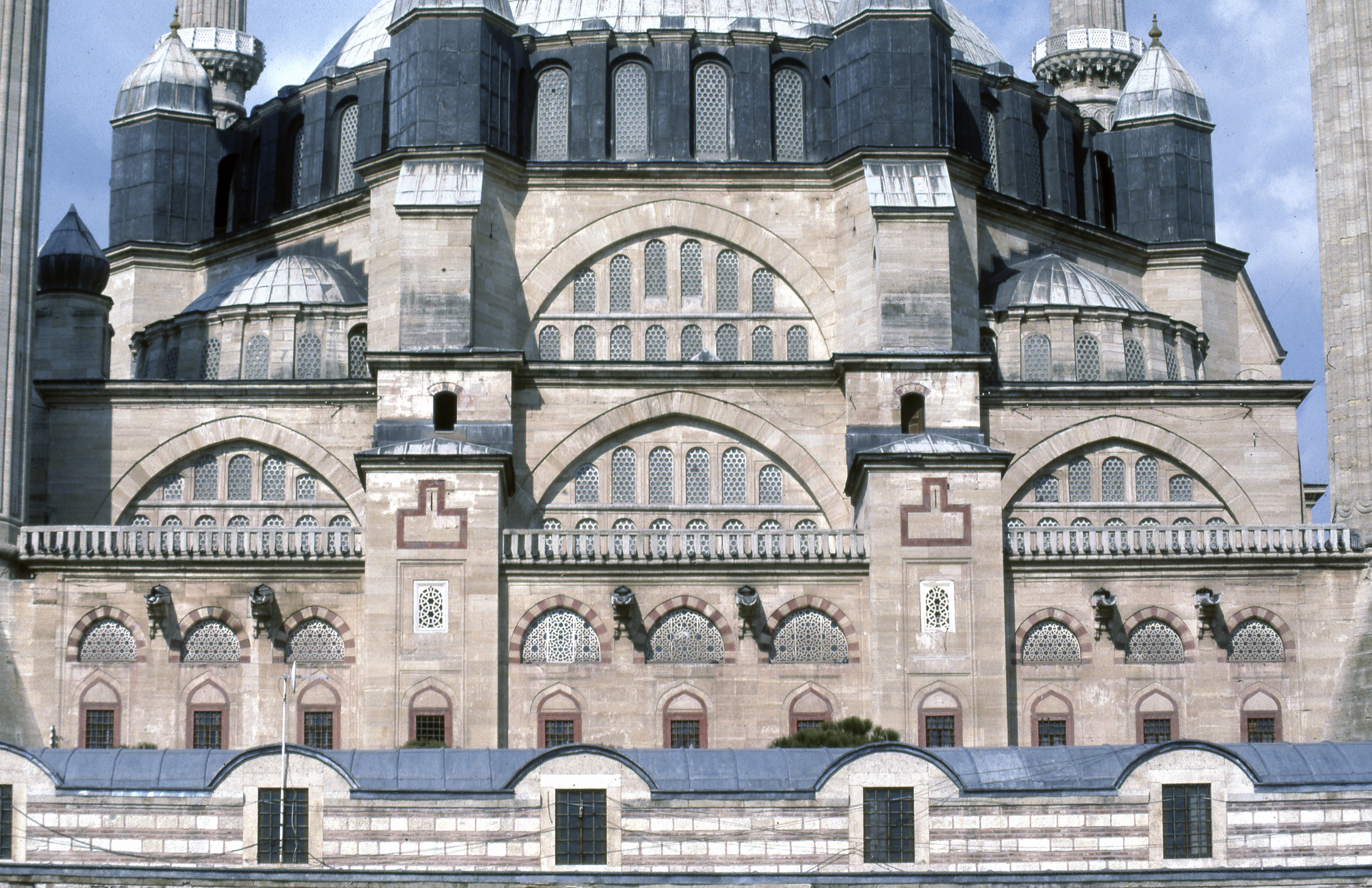
Exterior view of the upper walls and buttresses supporting the dome

===== Mihrab, religious furnishings, and decoration =====
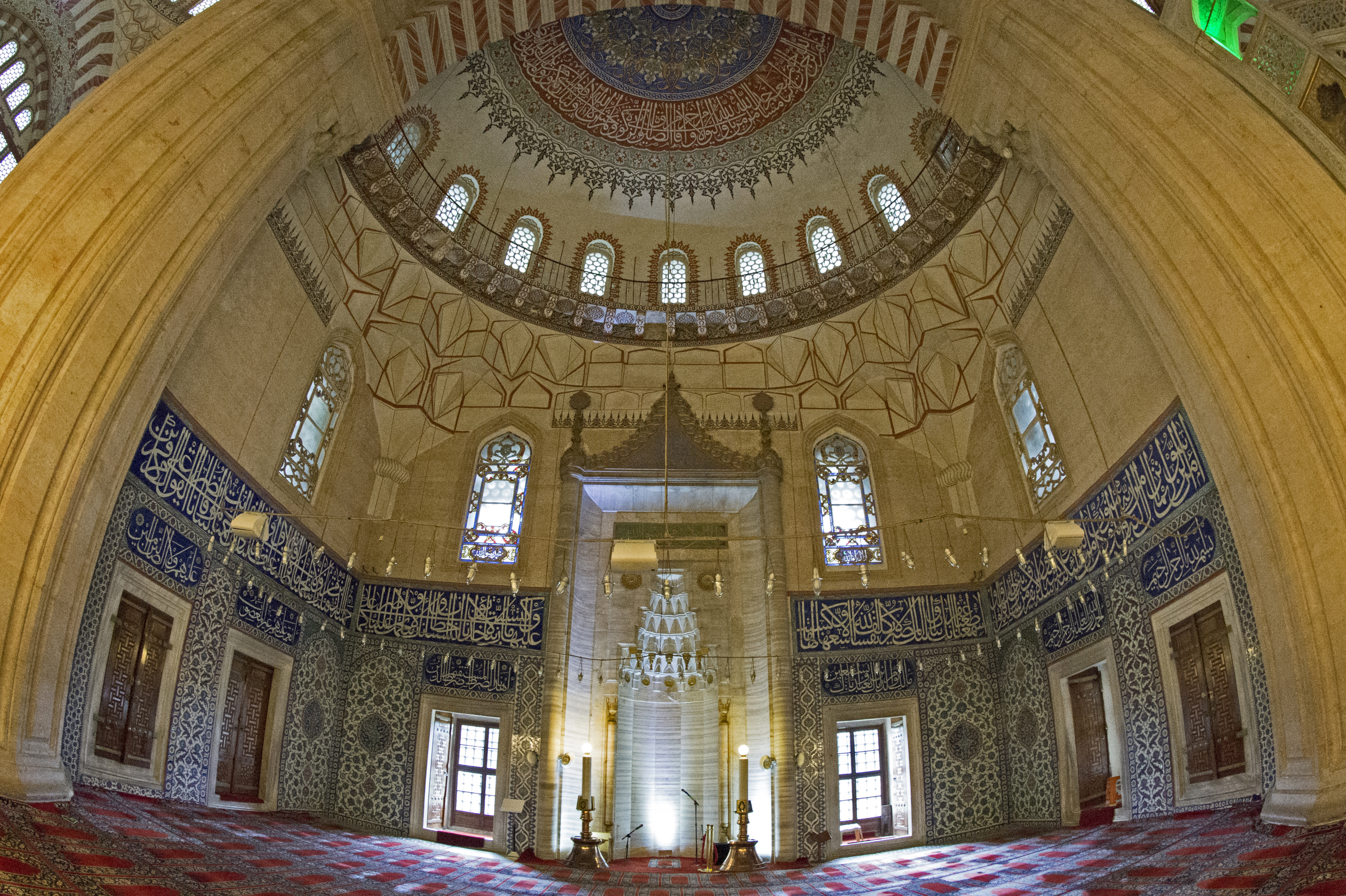
The mihrab area

The mihrab is set back from the rest of the prayer hall, standing in an apse-like projection with enough depth to allow for window illumination from three sides. This has the effect of making the tile panels of its lower walls sparkle with natural light. The tiles on either side of the mihrab are excellent examples of Iznik tilework. The mihrab itself is made of marble and is a good example of Ottoman stone-carving in this period, with a muqarnas hood and an inscription band. The mihrab decoration culminates above in a curved triangle set between two alems (a type of finial on a flagpole).

The minbar, standing next to the mihrab area, is among the finest examples of the stone minbars which by then had become common in Ottoman architecture. The stone surfaces are decorated with arches, pierced geometric motifs, and carved arabesques. The sultan's private balcony for prayers, or hünkâr mahfili, is set in an elevated position in the mosque's eastern corner and is also decorated with excellent Iznik tiles. A müezzin mahfili, a platform for the muezzin, stands in the center of the hall, directly under the main dome. This position, which obscures the view of the mihrab from the mosque entrance, is unusual in Ottoman architecture and was never repeated by Sinan. It may have been placed there to further emphasize the centrality of the dome above. The elevated platform is made of beautifully-painted wood supported by twelve low arches with multifoil forms. Under the platform is a marble fountain for ablutions and drinking.

The decoration around the mosque's interior includes marble stonework, painted decoration, and more Iznik tilework. Most of the painted decoration, which includes arabesque motifs, plant or flower motifs, and calligraphic inscriptions, mostly dates from a 19th-century restoration under Sultan Abdülmecid I and from later restorations. The original painted decoration was probably similar to the decoration of other Classical-period mosques. It included calligraphy by Hasan Karahisari (apprentice of Ahmed Karahisari) which was praised by Ottoman writers who saw it. Some of the best-preserved painted decoration from the Classical period (16th-17th centuries), uncovered during a 1980s restoration, can be found on the wooden surfaces of the müezzin mahfili. The windows were probably originally decorated with coloured Venetian glass.

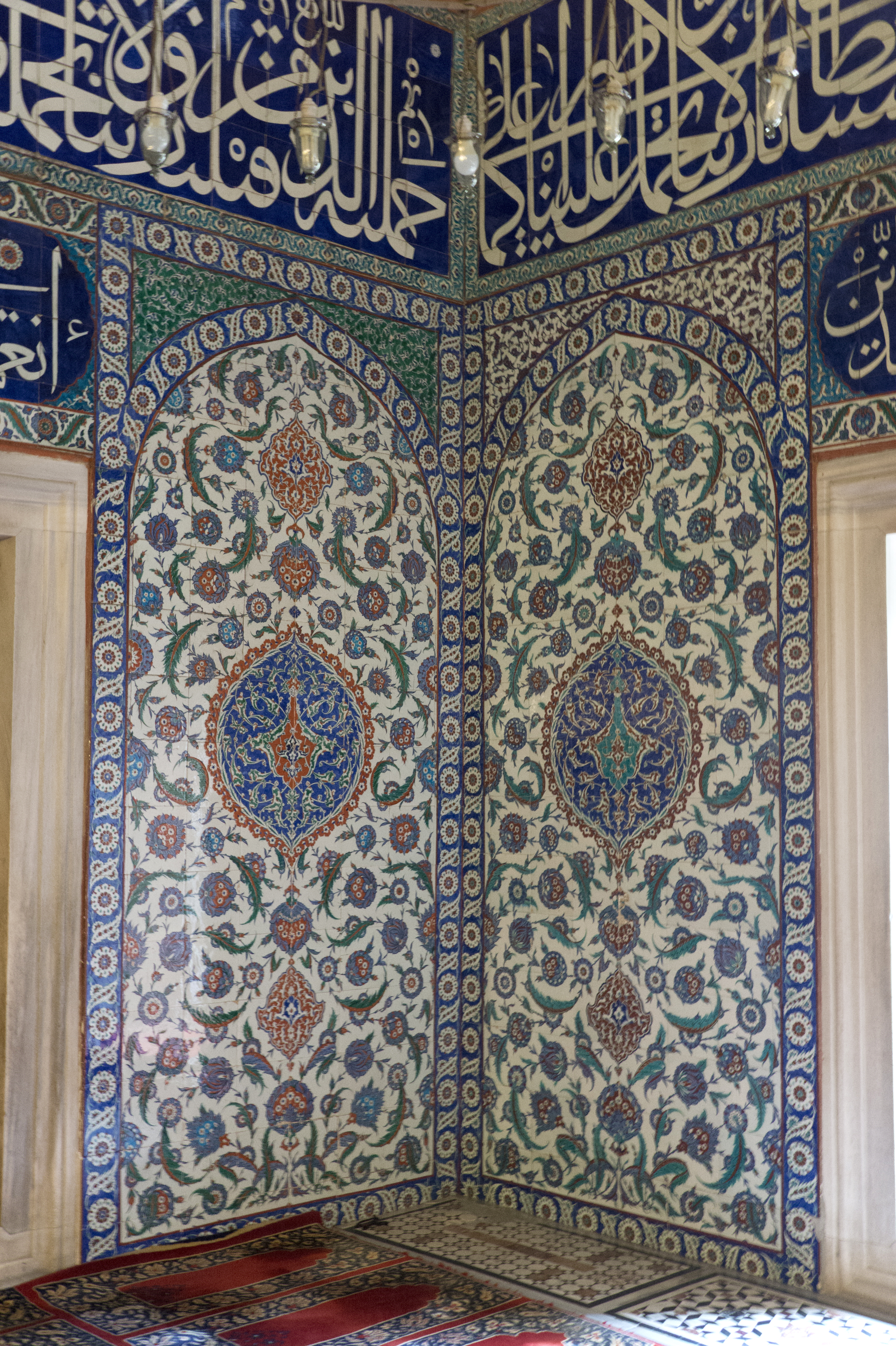
Iznik tiles next to the mihrab

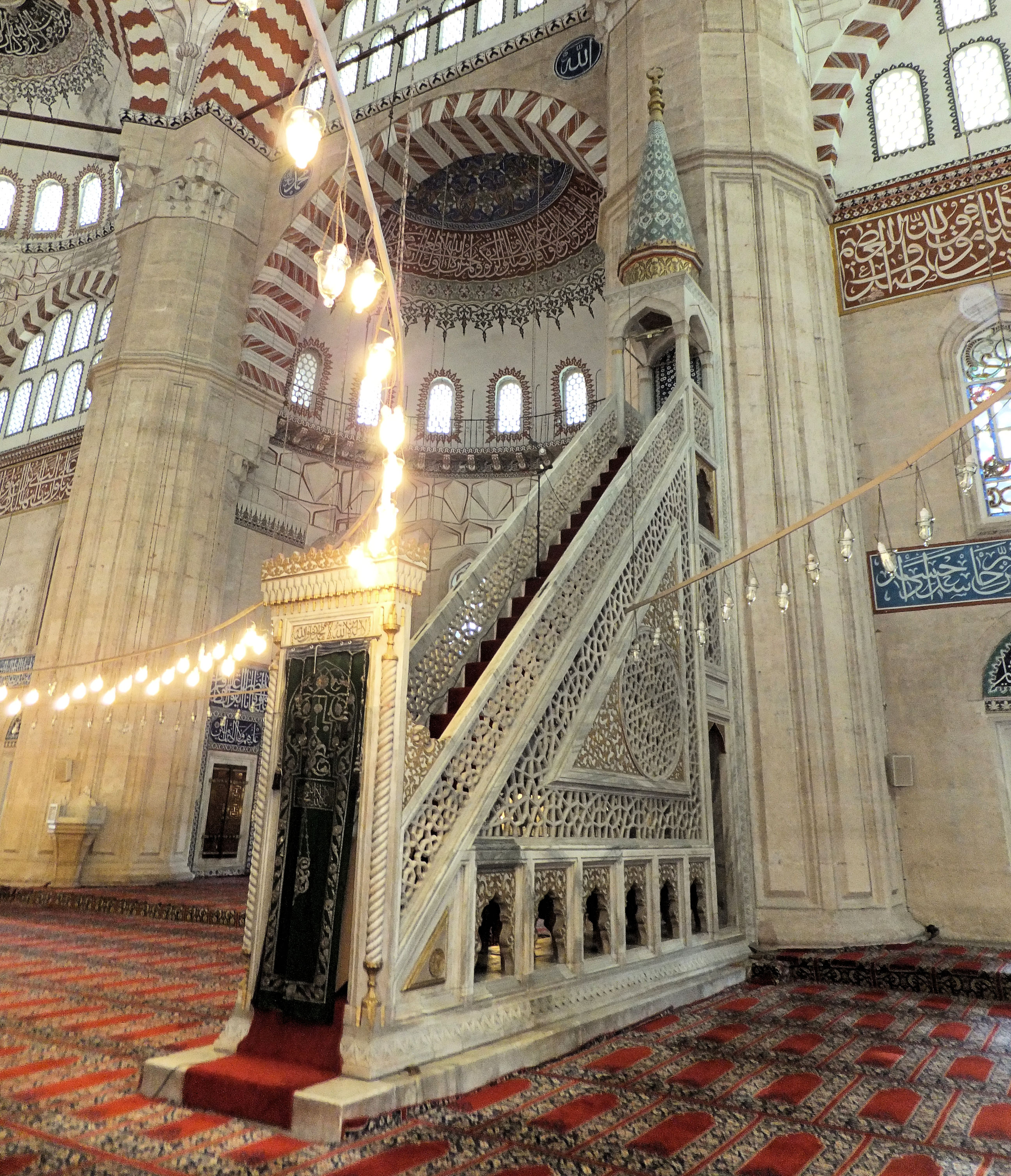
The minbar

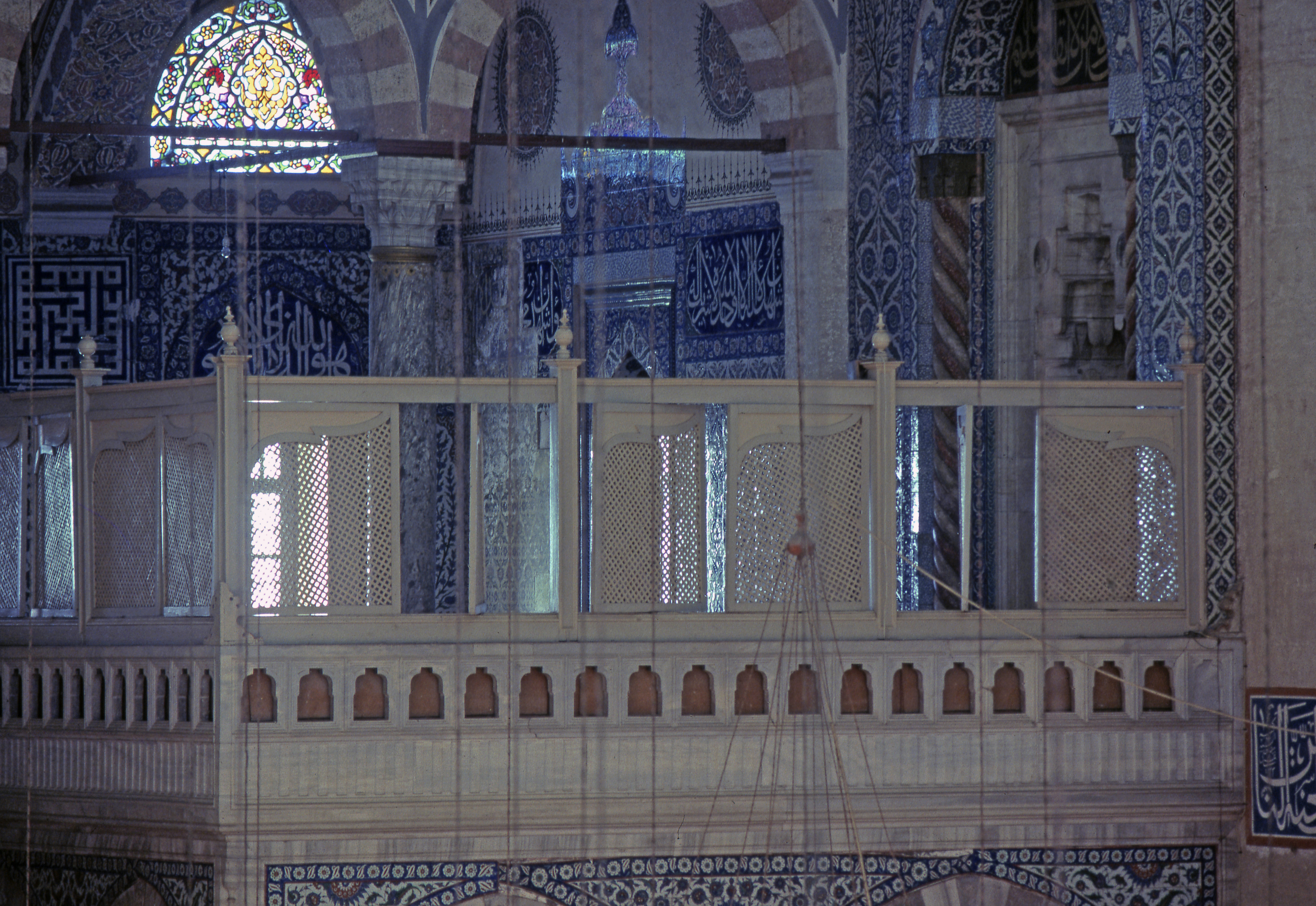
The sultan's loge (hünkâr mahfili)

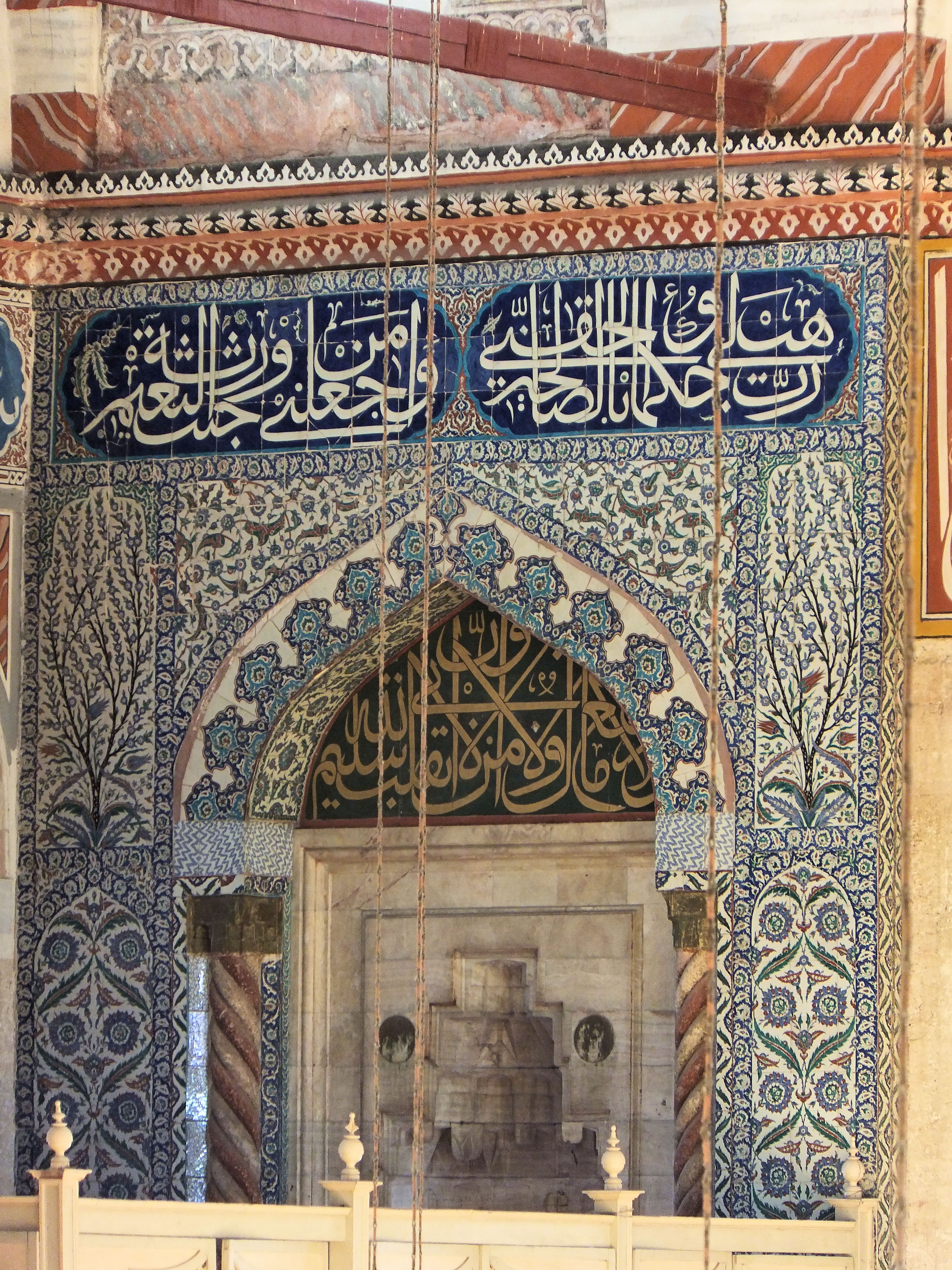
Iznik tile decoration around the mihrab of the sultan's loge

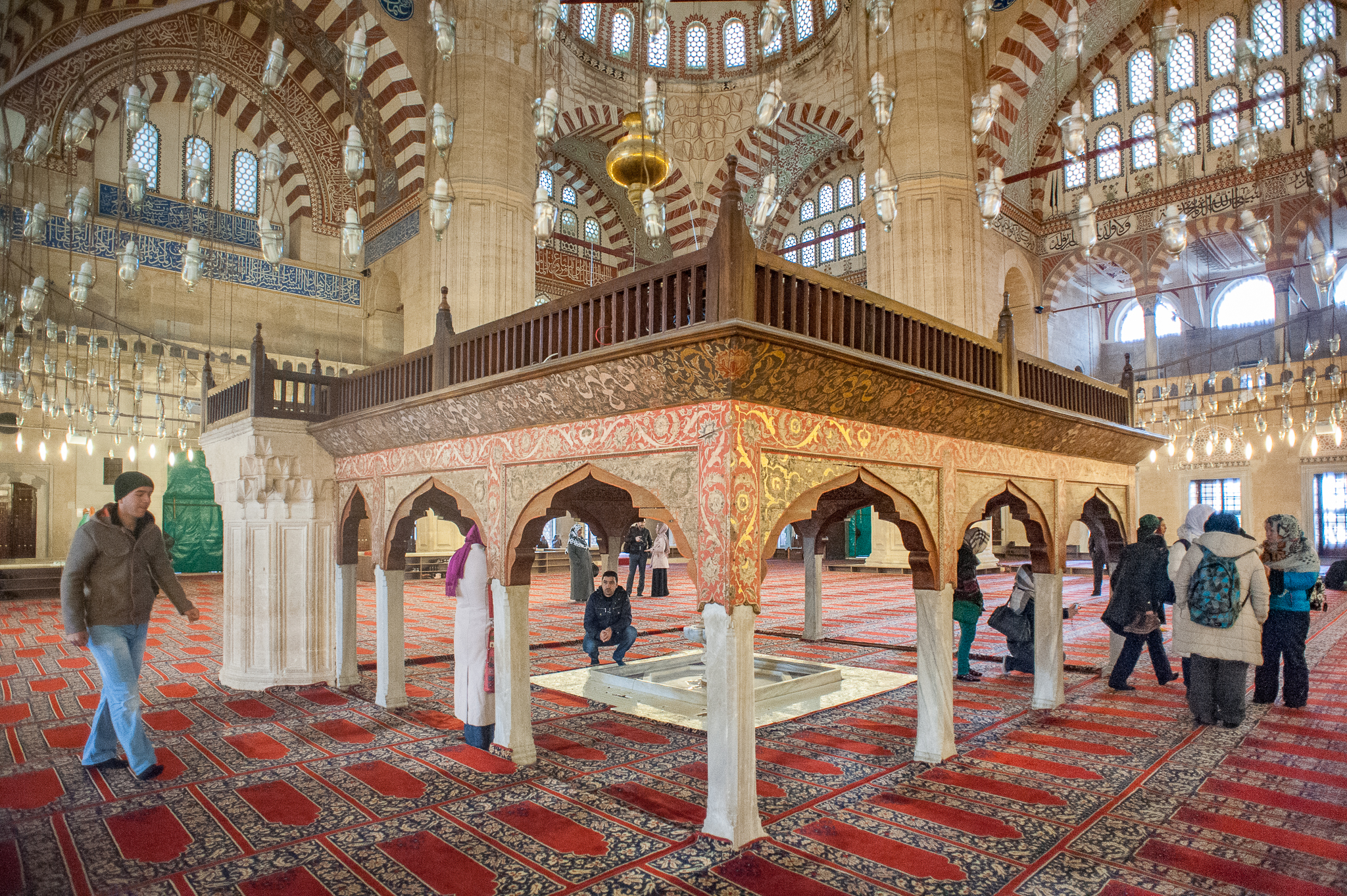
The muezzin's platform (müezzin mahfili)

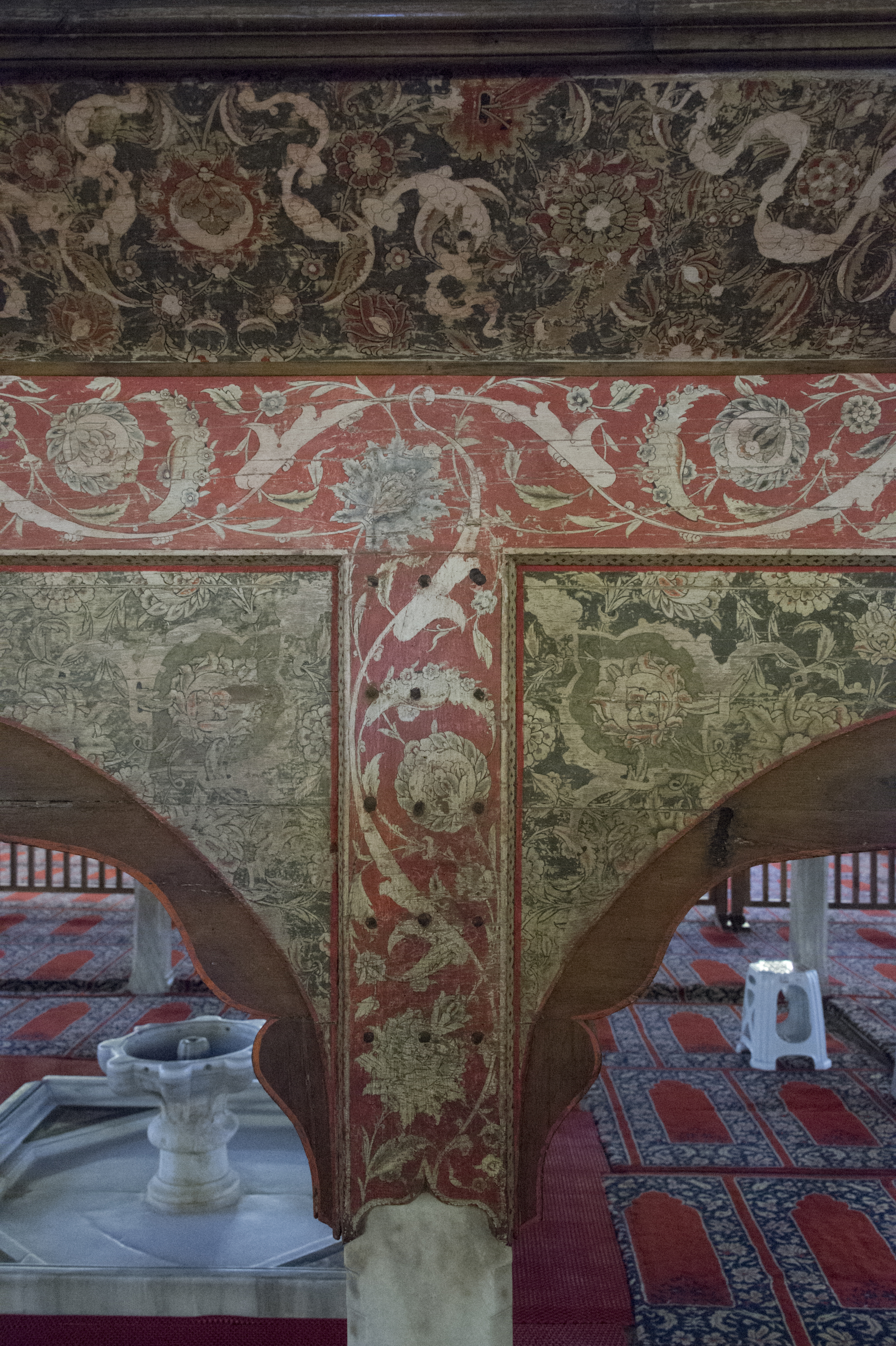
Painted decoration on the muezzin's platform

==== Minarets ====
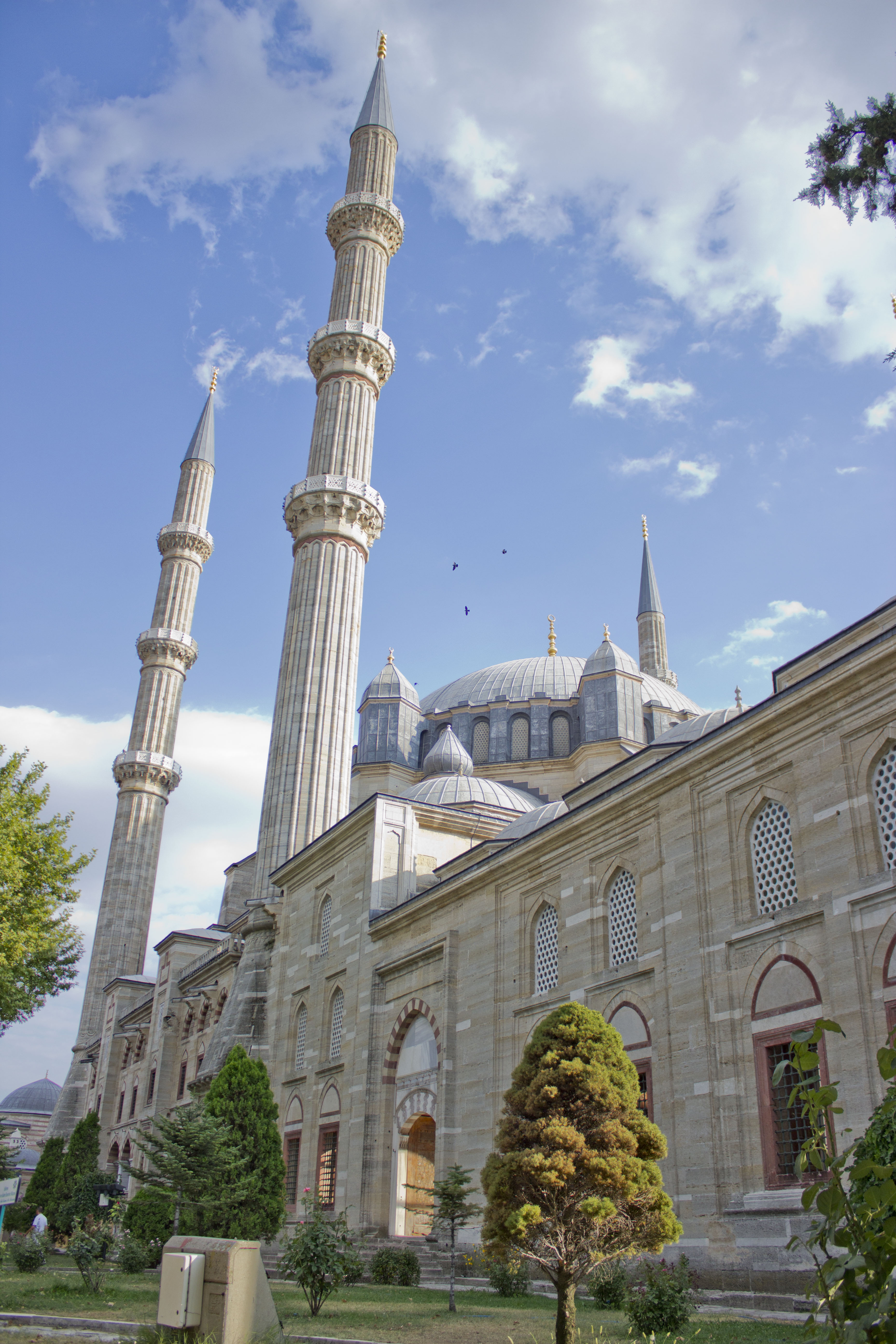
View of the minarets

The exterior of the mosque is marked by four minarets that are some of the tallest Ottoman minarets ever built, standing at 70.89 meters tall. In order to accentuate and draw attention to the central dome of the mosque, the traditional placement of different-sized minarets around the four corners of the courtyard was abandoned in favour of four identical minarets standing at the four corners of the prayer hall, thus framing the dome. The long-distance comparison with the Hagia Sophia was indirectly reiterated when the latter acquired a second pair of minarets in the same configuration, designed by Sinan during the reign of Murad III (r. 1574–1595).

=== Other buildings of the complex ===
The mosque stands at the center of a külliye (a religious and charitable complex) within an outer perimeter wall, occupying an elevated site measuring approximately 130 by 190 metres (430 by 620 ft). The complex includes two madrasas: the Dar'ül Kurra Medrese (a school for Qur'anic recitation) and a Dar-ül Hadis Medrese (a hadith school). The Dar'ül Kurra Medrese occupies the southeastern corner of the complex and the Dar-ül Hadis Medrese occupies the northeastern corner, both arranged in a symmetrical configuration around the main axis of the complex. Both structures consist of an internal square courtyard surrounded by porticos on four sides, rows of small domed rooms on two sides, and a larger domed dershane (classroom) on one side. Both were completed by Sinan while he was still in Edirne to oversee the mosque's construction.

The Dar'ül Kurra Medrese now houses the Selimiye Foundation Museum (Selimiye Vakıf Müzesi), which opened in 2006 and displays art and artefacts from religious foundations (vakifs) in and around Edirne. It was previously converted to a city museum in 1930, on the orders of Atatürk, then served various other functions including an office, a student hostel, and a warehouse, before the current museum. The Dar-ül Hadis Medrese now houses the Museum of Turkish and Islamic Arts of Edirne (Türk İslam Eserleri Müzesi), which displays objects of Islamic art from the region of Edirne as well as objects granted from the collections of the Topkapı Palace Museum and the Ethnography Museum of Ankara. It was first opened in 1925 and was reopened in 2012 after a long restoration.

The complex also includes a sibyan mektebi (elementary school) and an arasta (covered market street), located along the southern perimeter of the complex. These were added later and it's possible that they were completed instead by Davud Agha, Sinan's successor as chief court architect, though Sinan may have designed them. The sibyan mektebi consists of a domed hall adjoined by an open portico on its southwest side.

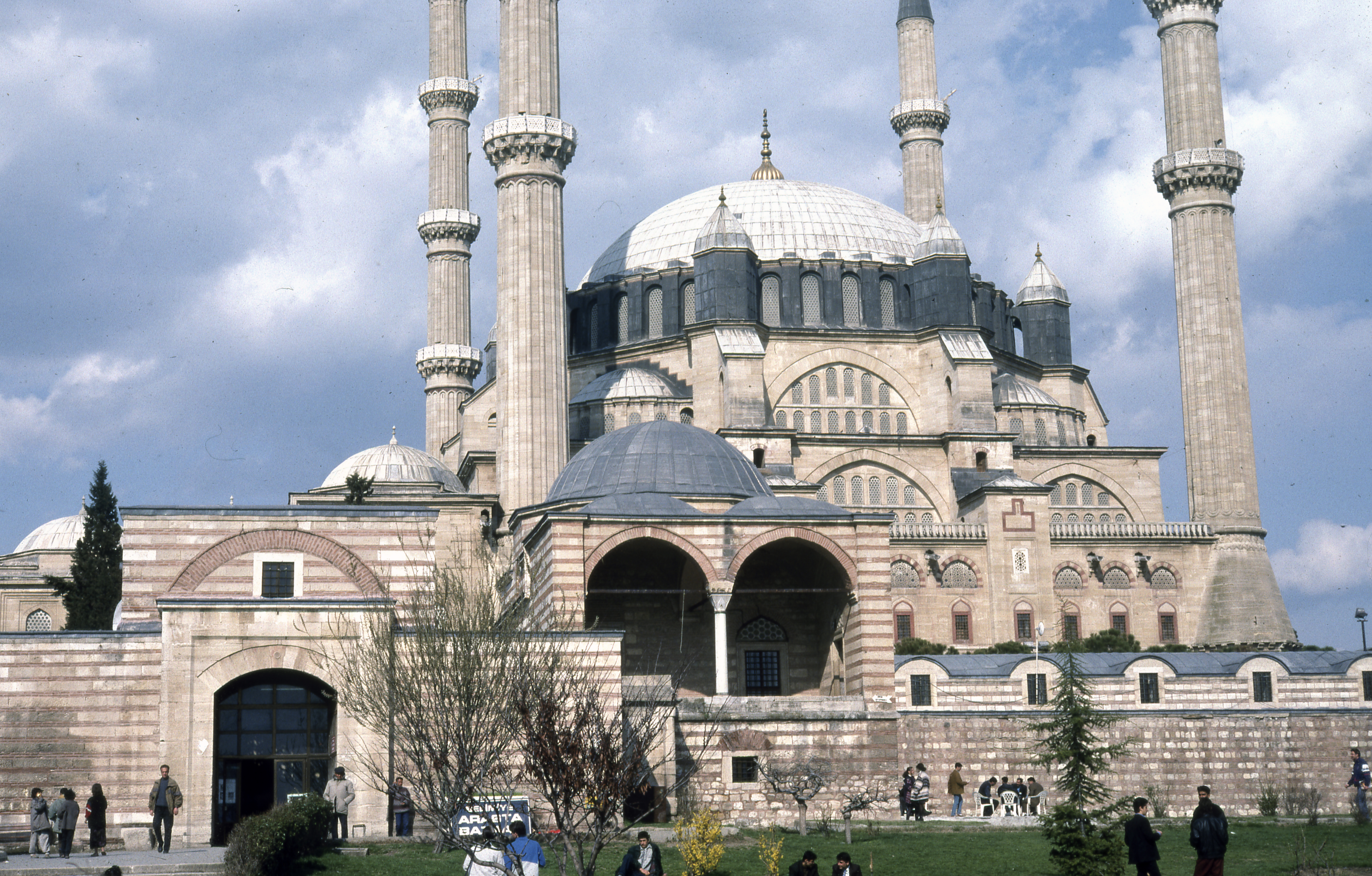
View of the arasta (market) and primary school on the south side of the complex, with the mosque behind

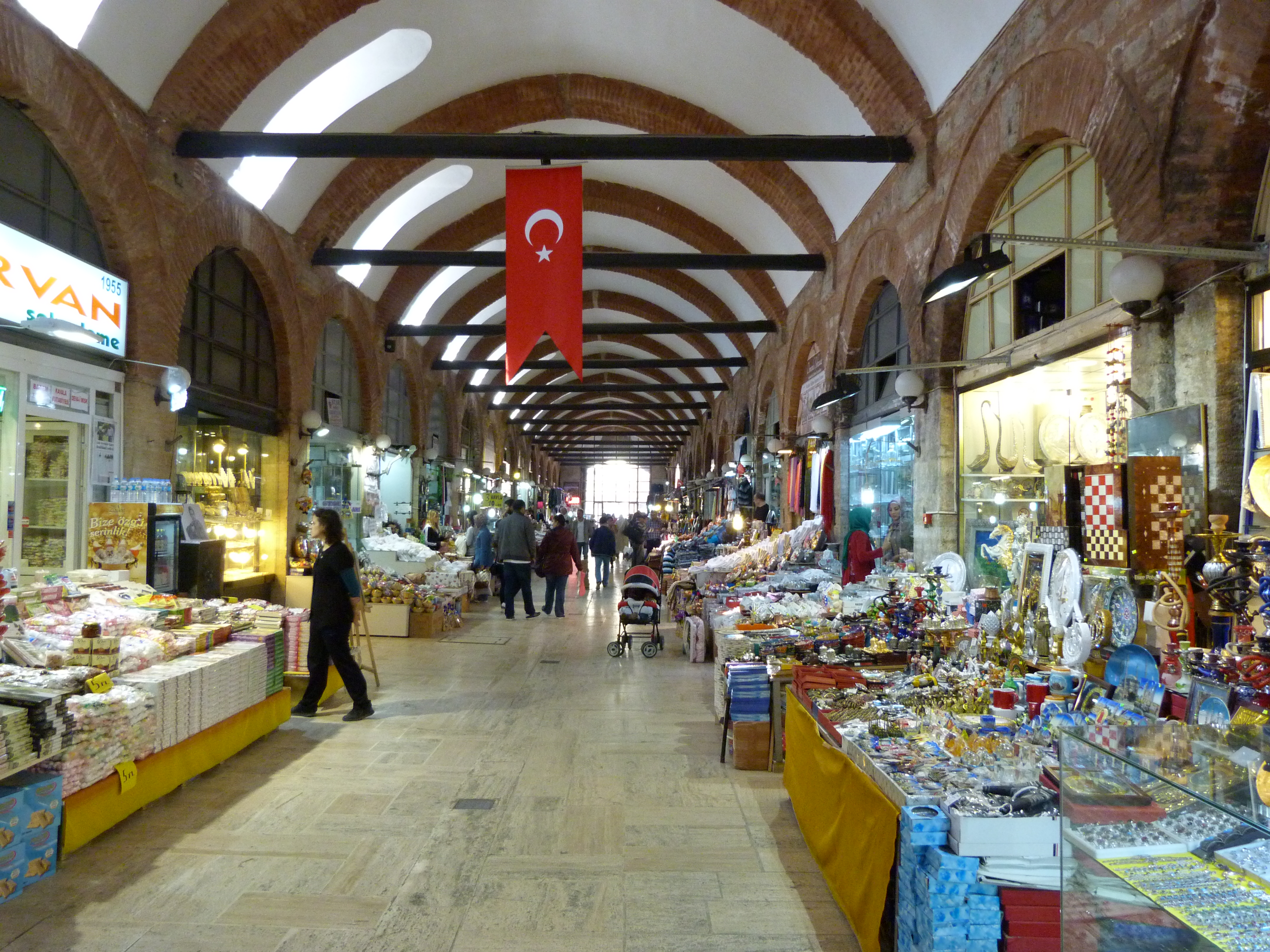
Inside the arasta (market)

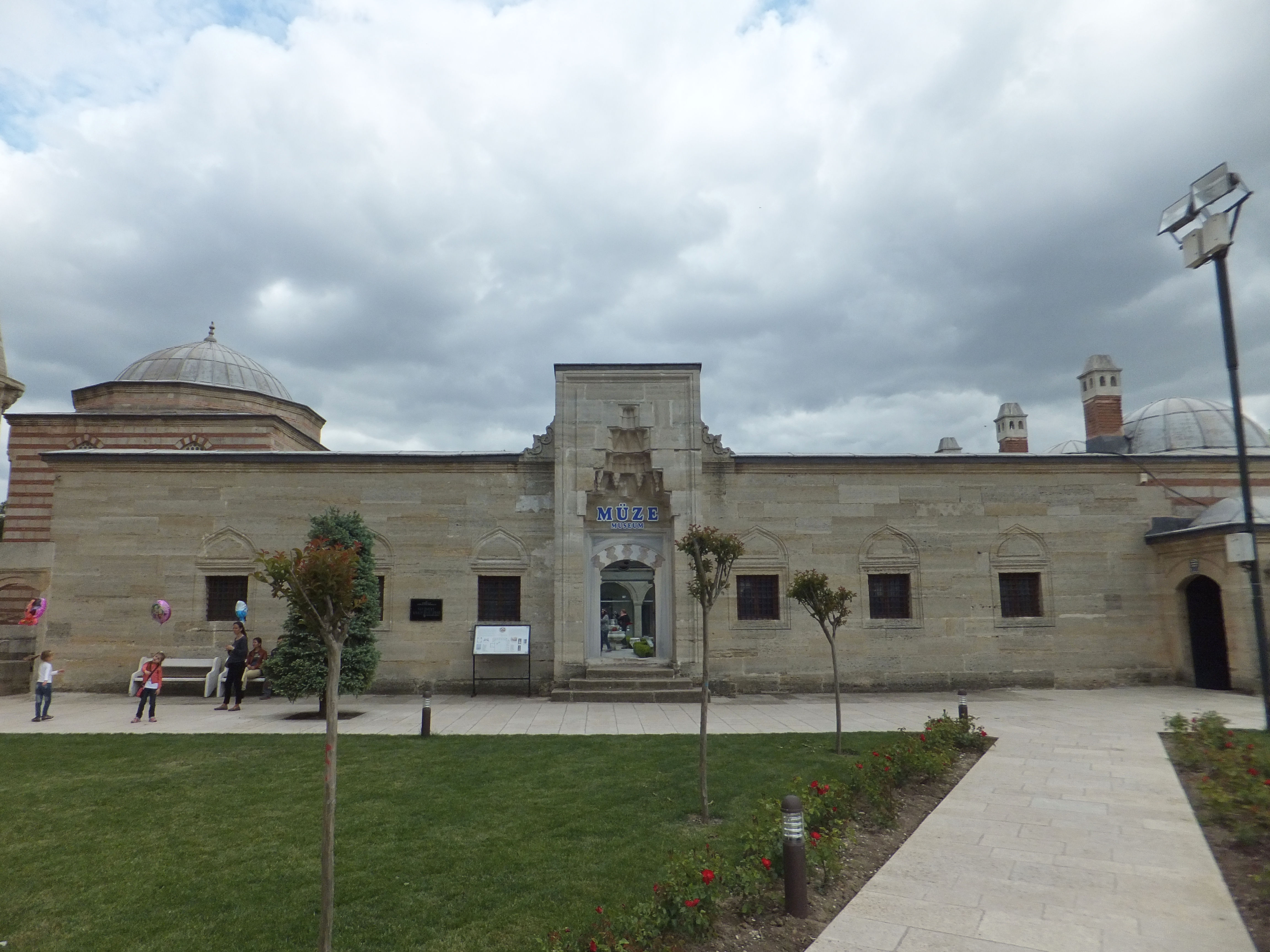
The Dar'ül Kurra Medrese (now the Selimiye Foundation Museum)

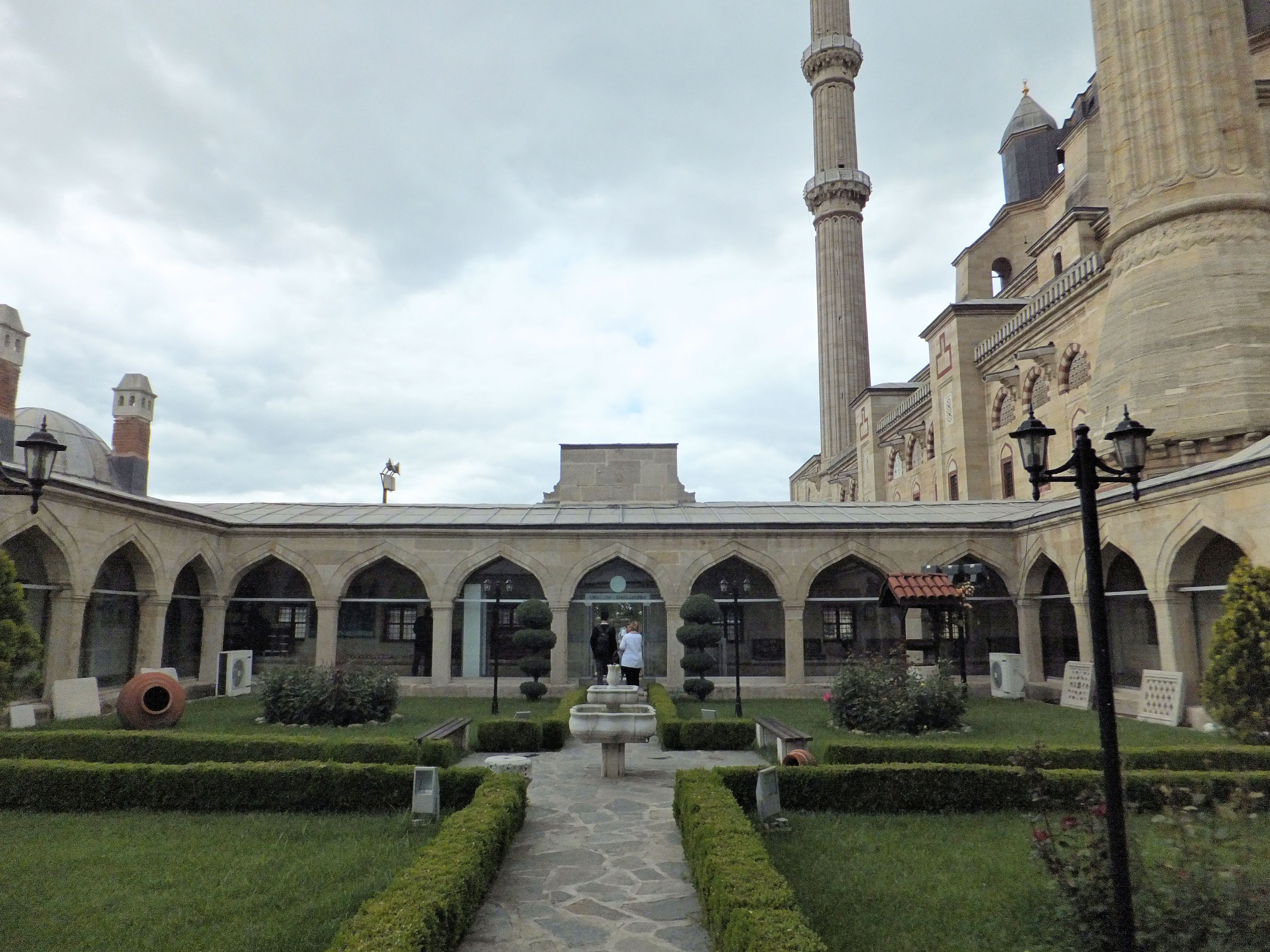
Courtyard of the Dar'ül Kurra Medrese

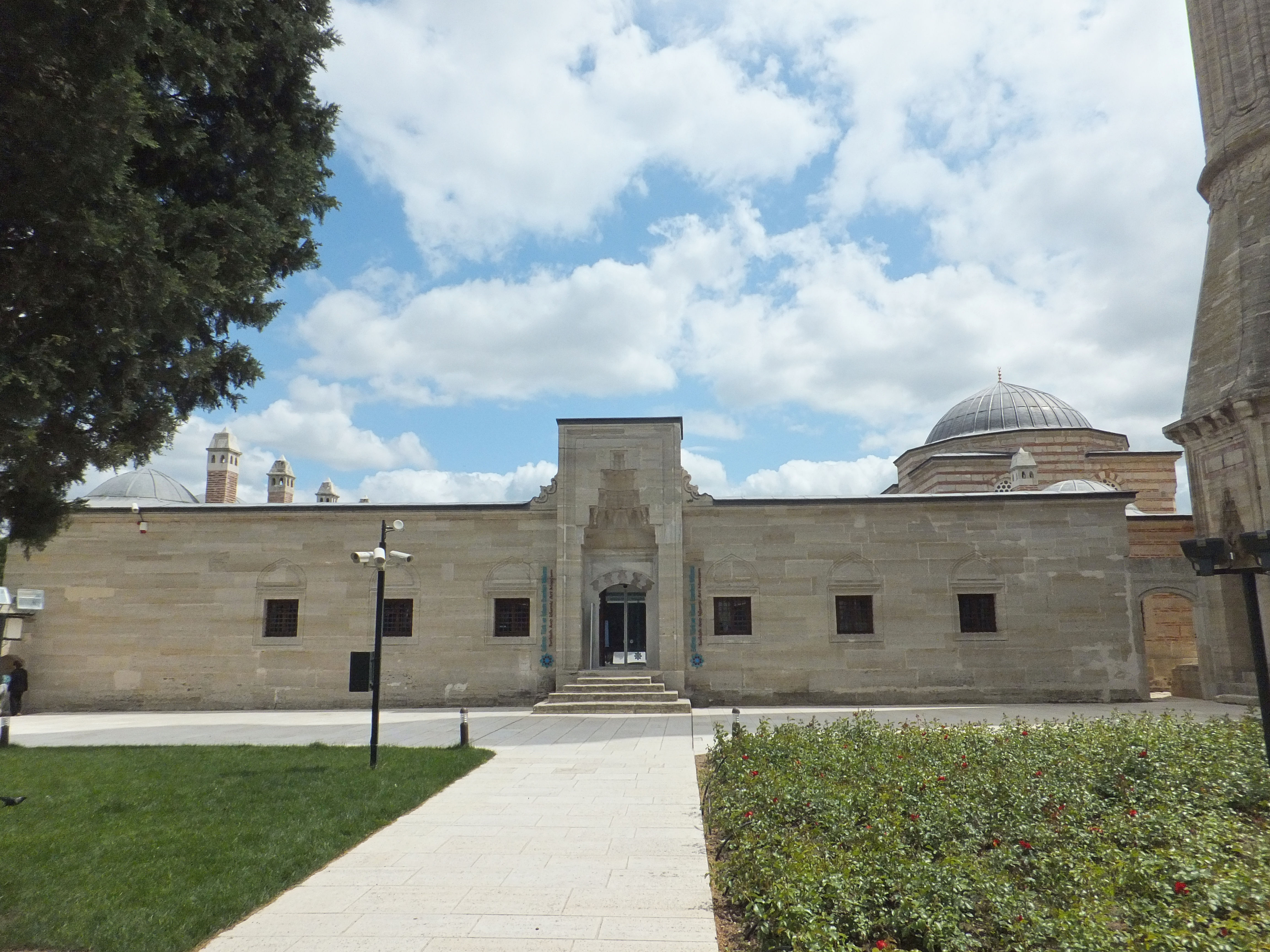
The Dar-ül Hadis Medrese (now the Museum of Turkish and Islamic Arts in Edirne)

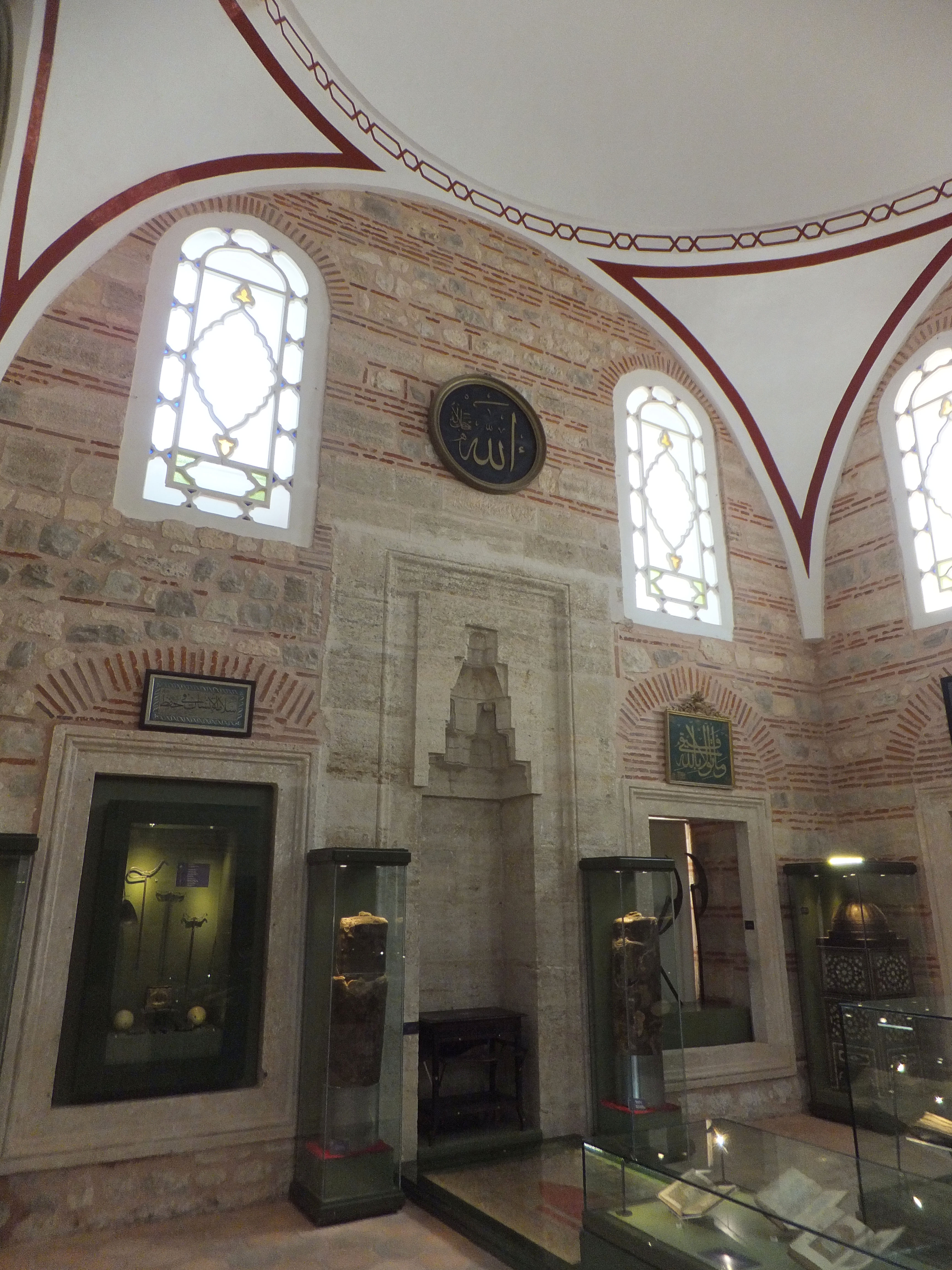
The dershane (classroom) of the Dar-ül Hadis Medrese

== Influence on later mosques ==
The design of the Selimiye Mosque has influenced the architecture of some later mosques. The form of the Laleli Mosque in Istanbul, built in the 18th century in an otherwise Ottoman Baroque style, is based on that of the Selimiye Mosque. The modern Sabancı Merkez Mosque in Adana, completed in 1998, was modelled in part on the Selimiye Mosque. The Nizamiye Mosque in South Africa is modeled on the Selimiye Mosque. Despite being 80% of the size of the Selimiye, the Nizamiye Mosque is the largest in the Southern hemisphere.

== See also ==
- List of Friday mosques designed by Mimar Sinan
- List of tallest structures built before the 20th century
