= Çakırağa Mansion =

Mansion in Birgi, Turkey

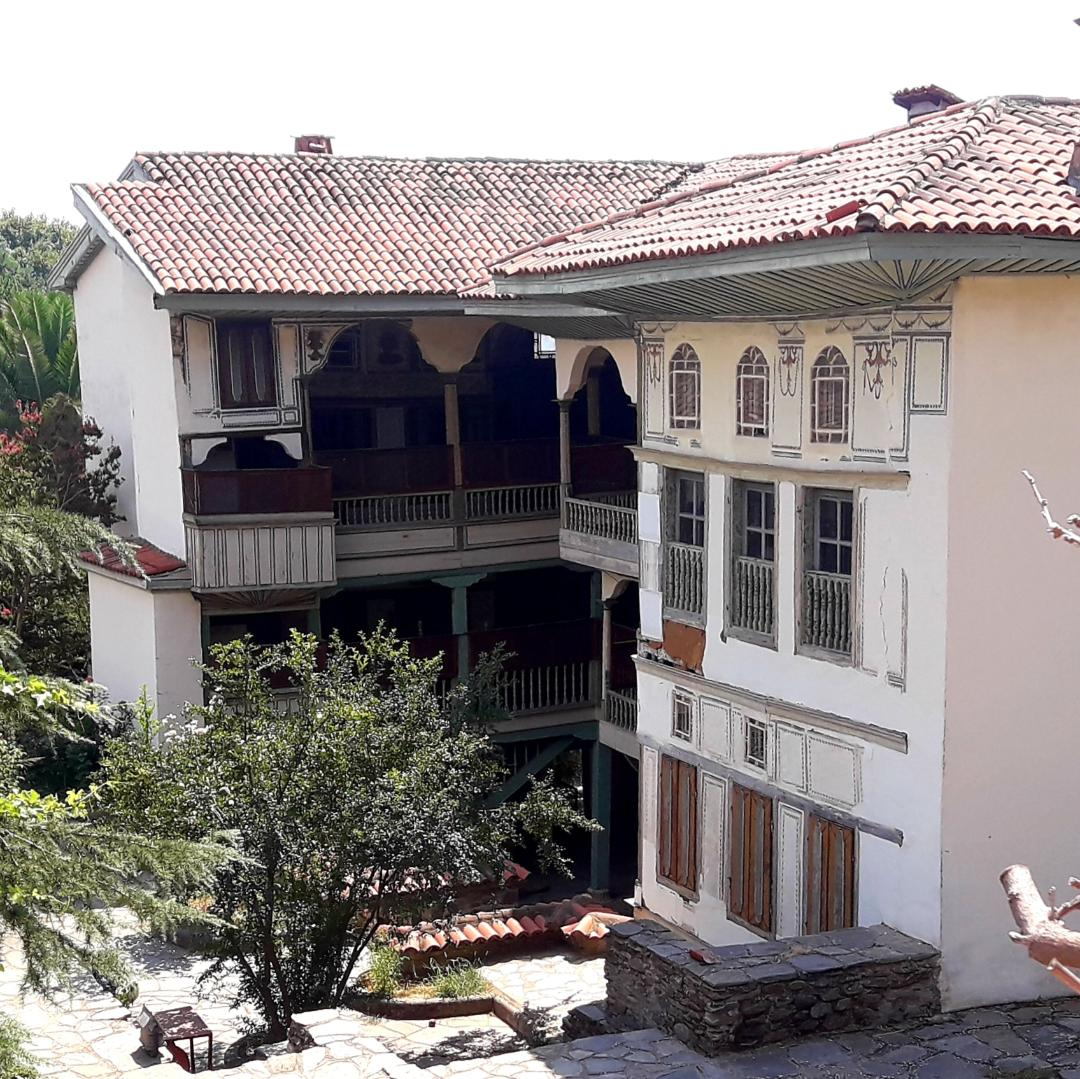
Çakırağa Mansion in Birgi

Çakırağa Mansion (Turkish: Çakırağa Konağı) is an historical mansion in İzmir Province, Turkey. It is in Birgi town of Ödemiş ilçe (district) at 38°15′20″N 28°03′56″E

It was commissioned in 1761 by Çakıroğlu Mehmet Bey who was a wealthy merchant. The three storey mansion is situated in a large garden with high embankments. The ground floor is reserved for the stables, the kitchen and the guest room. The first and the second floor are the living quarters. The first floor is the winter and the second floor is the summer floor. A central fireplace heats the first floor. In the second floor there are paintings of Istanbul and İzmir.
