= Dios Hieron (Lydia) =

Town of ancient Lydia,

Coordinates: 38°13′39″N 28°05′00″E

It is located 9 km. northeast of Ödemiş/İzmir.(ref: Tmolos’ta saklı kutsal bir kent Dioshieron, Hüseyin Üreten, Journal of International Social Research, Vol 9, Issue 44: 562-578) Dios Hieron (Ancient Greek: Διὸς Ἱερόν, meaning 'Sanctuary of Zeus') was a town of ancient Lydia, in the upper valley of the Cayster River. The city became part of the Roman Republic and the Roman province of Asia with the annexation of the Attalid kingdom. It also bore the name Diospolis (Διόσπολις), and was cited by the sixth century Byzantine geographer Stephanus of Byzantium under that name. It was renamed to Christopolis or Christoupolis (Χριστούπολις, meaning 'city of Christ') in the 7th century and was known as Pyrgium or Pyrgion (Πυργίον) from the 12th century on. Pyrgion fell to the Turks in 1307, and became the capital of the beylik of Aydin. The town minted coins in antiquity, often with the inscription "Διοσιερειτων".

Its site is located near Birgi, Asiatic Turkey.

== Bishopric ==
The Roman Era city had an ancient Christian bishop and is attested as an episcopal see from at least 451. It was a suffragan of Ephesus, which it remained under until the late 12th century when it became a separate metropolis. In 1368, the Ecumenical Patriarch Philotheus I issued a pronouncement uniting the metropolis of Pyrgion with Ephesus, due to the latter's decline. The church disappears from the records in the 15th century.

There are four known bishops from antiquity.

- Stephen took part in the Council of Ephesus of 431
- Eustorgios was not present at the Council of Chalcedon (451) and his metropolitan, Stephen of Ephesus, signed on his behalf
- Zoetus was among the fathers of the Council of Constantinople of 680 and the Council in Trullo of 692
- Stephen of Pyrgion participated at the two Councils of Constantinople in 869–870 and 879–880 who dealt with the issue of Patriarch Photios I of Constantinople

Today Dioshieron survives as titular see in the Roman Catholic Church, so far the see has never been assigned.
