= Baianópolis =

Municipality of Bahia, Brazil

- Municipality
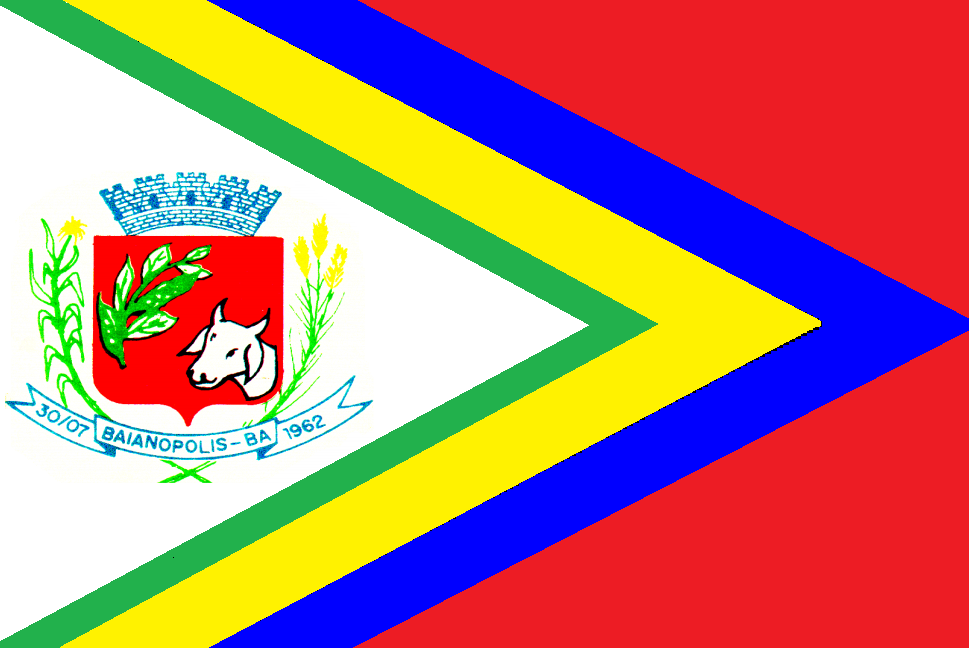
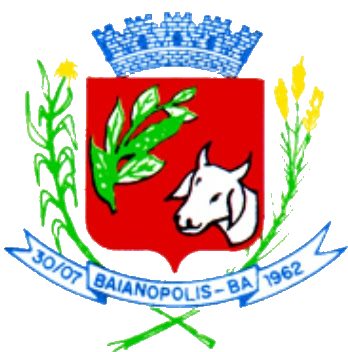
- Flag Coat of arms

- Location in Brazil
- Coordinates: 12°18′21″S 44°32′06″W
- Country: Brazil
- Region: Nordeste
- State: Bahia

Population (2020)
  - Total: 13,929
- Time zone: UTC−3 (BRT)

Baianópolis is a municipality in the state of Bahia in the North-East region of Brazil.

== See also ==
- List of municipalities in Bahia
