= Birgi =

- Neighbourhood
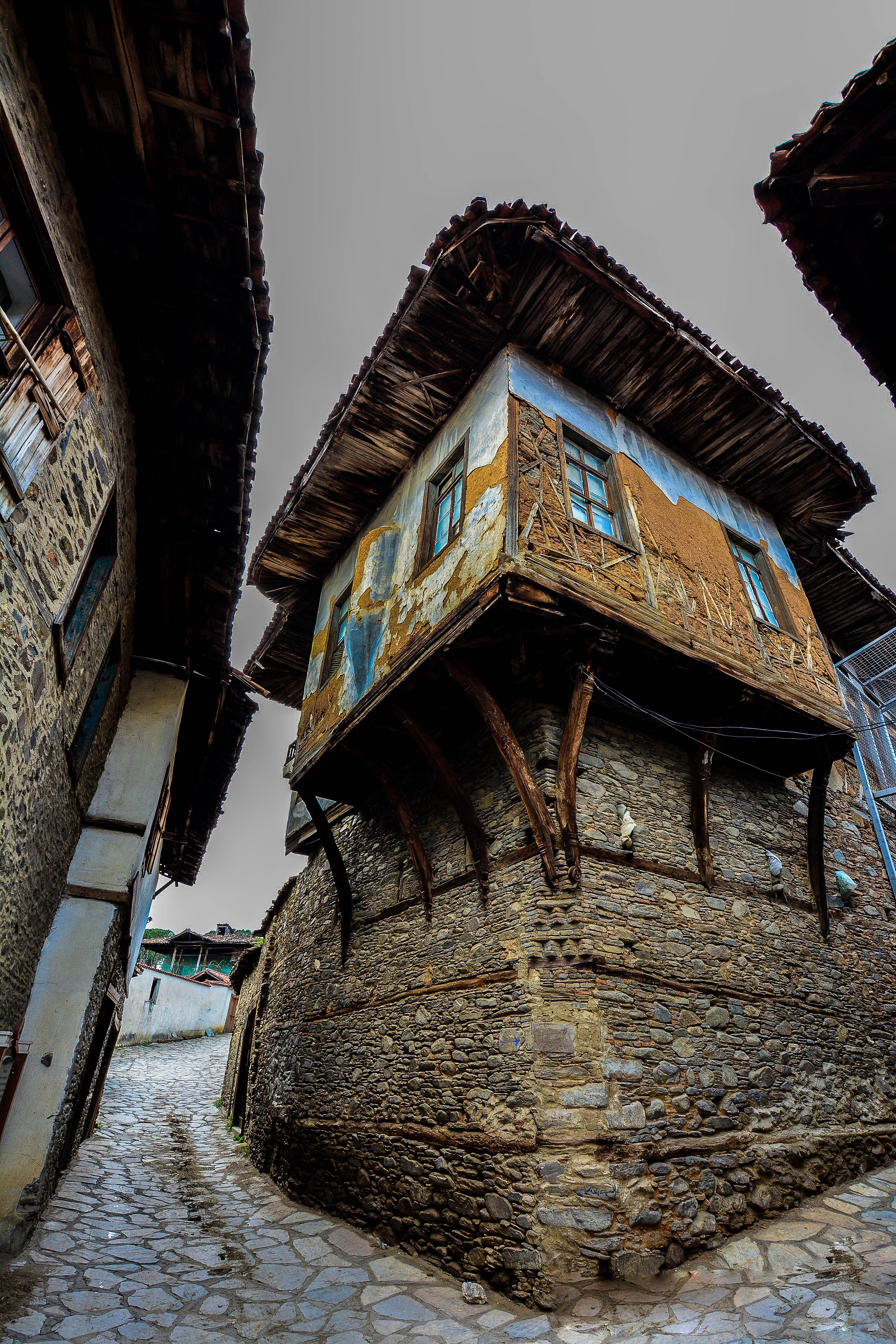
- Ottoman era houses of Birgi

- Location within Turkey Location within İzmir
- Coordinates: 38°15′18″N 28°03′54″E
- Country: Turkey
- Province: İzmir
- District: Ödemiş
- Elevation: 326 m (1,070 ft)
- Population (2022): 1,832
- Time zone: UTC+3 (TRT)
- Postal code: 35750
- Area code: 0232

Birgi is a neighbourhood in the municipality and district of Ödemiş, İzmir Province, Turkey. Its population is 1,832 (2022). Before the 2013 reorganisation, it was a town (belde). Its current name is a turkified version of its medieval Greek name, Pyrgion (Greek: Πυργίον, meaning "Little Tower").

== History ==
In antiquity, the town was known as Dios Hieron (Greek: Διός Ἱερόν, 'Sanctuary of Zeus'), one of two cities thus named. The city became part of the Roman Republic and the Roman province of Asia with the annexation of the Kingdom of Pergamon.

It was renamed to Christoupolis (Greek: Χριστούπολις) in the 7th century and was known as Pyrgion (Greek: Πυργίον) from the 12th century on. Pyrgion fell to the Turks in 1307, and became the capital of the beylik of Aydin.

Ibn Battuta visited the city and attended a lecture by the eminent professor Muhyi al-Din.

It was subsequently incorporated into the Ottoman Empire in 1390. Birgi is well known for its classic Seljuk and Ottoman architecture and has been listed as a World Cultural Heritage by ÇEKÜL(Protection and Promotion of the Environment and Cultural Heritage) since 1994.

In 2021, archaeologists unearthed a Byzantine fort.

== Bishopric ==
The Roman Era city had an ancient Christian Bishopric attested as an episcopal see from at least 451, It was a suffragan of Ephesus, which it remained under until the late 12th century when it became a separate metropolis.

There are four known bishops of this diocese from antiquity.

- Stephen took part in the Council of Ephesus of 431
- Eustorgios was not present at the Council of Chalcedon (451) and his metropolitan, Stephen of Ephesus, signed on his behalf
- Zoetus was among the fathers of the Council of Constantinople of 680 and the Council in Trullo of 692
- Stephen of Pyrgion participated at the two Councils of Constantinople in 869–870 and 879–880 who dealt with the issue of Patriarch Photios I of Constantinople

Today Dioshieron survives as titular bishopric in the Roman Catholic Church, so far the see has never been assigned.

== Notable historic structures ==
- Çakırağa Mansion — built in 18th-century Ottoman style by the wealthy Çakırağa family.
- Aydınoğlu Mehmet Bey Mosque — commissioned in 1313 by Mehmet Bey, the founder of the Aydinids.
- Aydınoğlu Baths (14th century)
- Tomb of Birgivi Mehmet Efendi (16th century)
- Birgivi Mehmet Efendi Madrasa (16th century)
- Sultanşah Mausoleum
- Fortress Madrasa, where Sultan Mehmed II the Conqueror (March 30, 1432 – May 3, 1481) was educated.
- Sandıkoğlu Mansion (19th century)
- Karaoğlu Mosque (18th century)
- Birgi city walls
- Iron Magazine (16th century)
