= ÇEKÜL =

Cultural heritage foundation in Turkey

ÇEKÜL is a cultural heritage foundation in Turkey. It is the acronym of Çevre ve Kültür Değerlerini Koruma ve Tanıtma Vakfı ("Preservation and Promotion Foundation of the Environment and Culture") Its head office is in Istanbul. Presently its speaker is Professor Metin Sözen.The year 1975 was a milestone in many parts of the world when the awareness of conservation and preservation was first raised at the theoretical level, when the concept of "common heritage" was articulated for the first time, and in Turkey, when Metin Sözen and his colleagues brought this concept to the agenda in Safranbolu. The conservation and preservation efforts initiated in Safranbolu in the 1975s had achieved one of their goals with the city's inclusion on the UNESCO World Heritage List.

Çekül was founded in 1990 by a group of intellectuals. It is a Non Governmental Organization specialized in consultation of such subjects as city planning, restoration and maintenance of the houses and traditional market places. It is also a major participant of the Turkish Historical Cities Association.
