= Grand Mosque of Birgi =

14th-century Anatolian beylik-era mosque in Izmir Province, western Turkey

- Aydınoğlu Mehmet Bey Camii
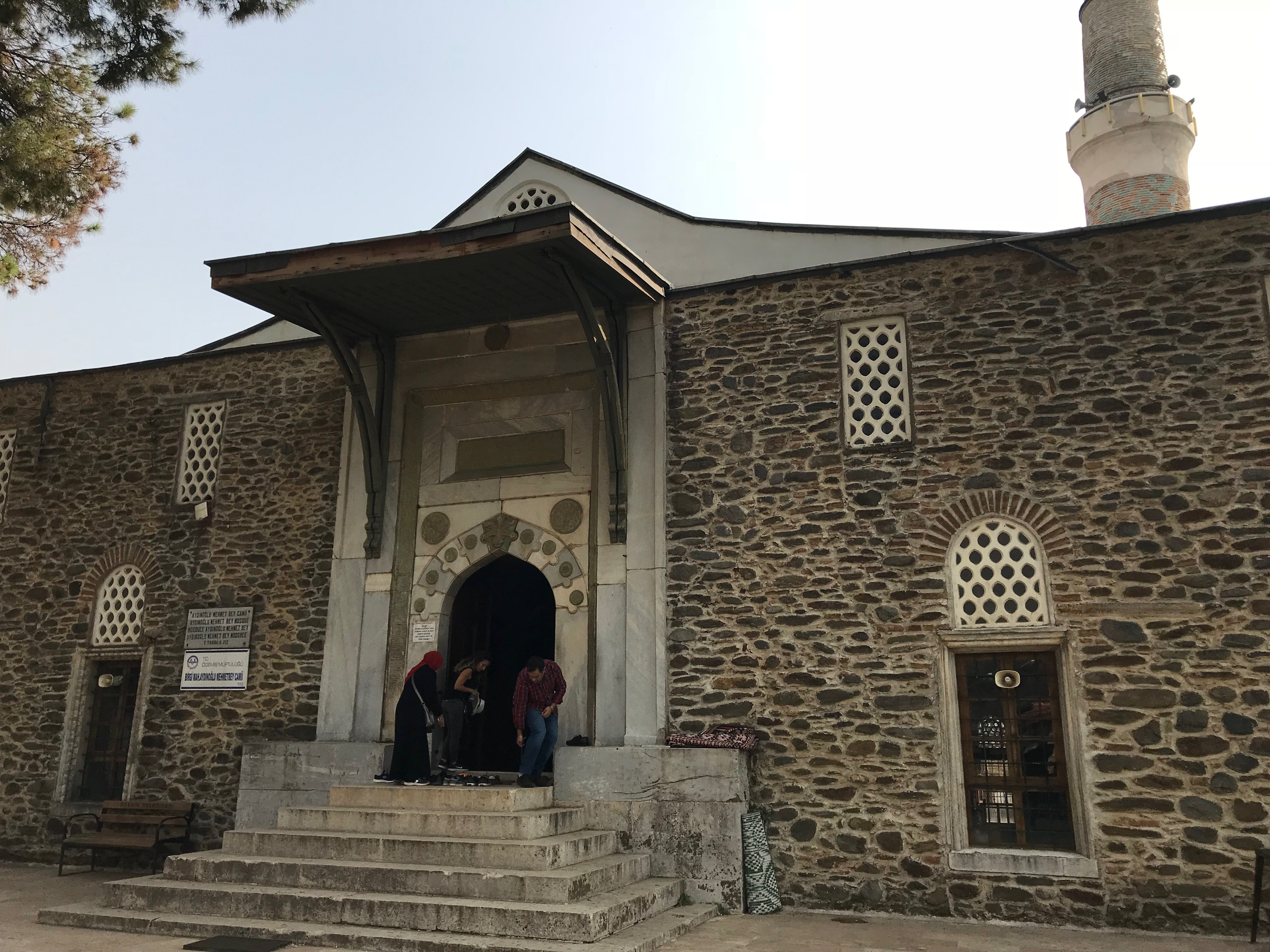

- Location within Turkey

Religion
- Affiliation: Islam

Location
- Municipality: Birgi, Ödemiş
- State: İzmir
- Country: Turkey
- Interactive map of Grand Mosque of Birgi
- Coordinates: 38°15′24″N 28°04′02″E

Architecture
- Type: mosque
- Established: 1312

Birgi Grand Mosque (Turkish: Aydınoğlu Mehmet Bey Camii), also called "Aydınoğlu Mehmet Bey Mosque", is a historical mosque in Turkey.

The mosque is in the Birgi town in Ödemiş ilçe (district) of İzmir Province.

Aydınids was an Anatolian beylik ( principality ) in the 14th century in West Anatolia. Birgi, now a village was the capital of the beylik. The mosque was commissioned by Mehmet, the first ruler of the beylik.

== Architecture ==
The mosque was built in 1312. It is an example of a typical Seljukid mosque. The most notable sections of the mosque are the fine woodworking mimbar which has no metallic nail and the mihrab which is made of dark cyan marble. The lion statue in the south eastern corner of the building is also interesting for statues are rare in Islamic architecture and this statue is a spolia from a Lydian building.

== Mimbar gate theft ==
In 1993 the gate of the mimbar disappeared and it was discovered by a British tourist in British Museum. The Ministry of Culture and Tourism purchased the gate and in 1996 it returned to where it belongs.
