= Aegean Sea earthquake =

Aegean Sea earthquake may refer to:

- 1968 Aegean Sea earthquake
- 2014 Aegean Sea earthquake
- 2017 Aegean Sea earthquake
- 2020 Aegean Sea earthquake

Earthquakes in the Aegean Sea:

- 262 Southwest Anatolia earthquake
- 1688 Smyrna earthquake
- 1881 Chios earthquake
- 1904 Samos earthquake
- 1932 Ierissos earthquake
- 1956 Amorgos earthquake
- 2006 Greece earthquake
- 2017 Lesbos earthquake
