= Doğanbey, Seferihisar =

Doğanbey
- Settlement
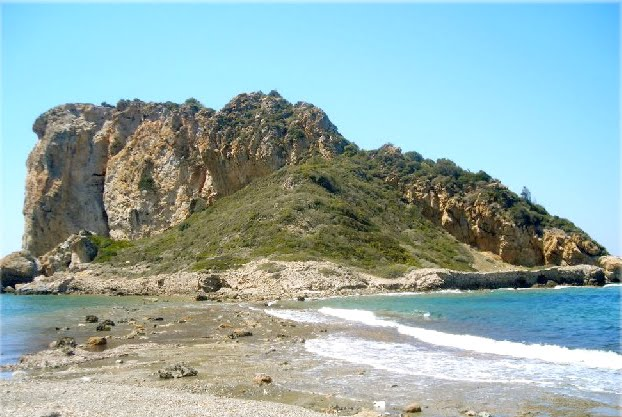
- The rock of Myonessos near Doğanbey

- Location within Turkey
- Coordinates: 38°04′N 26°53′E
- Country: Turkey
- Region: Aegean
- Province: İzmir
- District: Seferihisar

Population (2007)
  - Total: 2,456
- Time zone: UTC+3 (TRT)

Doğanbey, named İpsili or İpsili Hisar until the late Ottoman period, is a settlement and former municipality in the district of Seferihisar, İzmir Province, western Turkey. The municipality was merged into the municipality of Seferihisar in 2008. Its population was 2,456 in 2007. It is near the ancient sites of Myonnesos and Lebedos (Lebedus in Latin) and believed to have derived from that settlement from the time when, in antiquity, most of its population was deported to Ephesus.
