= Doğanbey =

Doğanbey is the name of several localities in Turkey:

- Doğanbey, Beyşehir, a township with its own municipality in Beyşehir, Konya Province
- Doğanbey, Karaçoban
- Doğanbey, Seferihisar, a coastal township with its own municipality in Seferihisar, İzmir Province
- Doğanbey, Söke, a village in Söke, Aydın Province
- Doğanbey, Yapraklı

Furthermore, in association with Doğanbey, Seferihisar, are the following geographical names:

- Doğanbey Cape (anciently Makria)
- Doğanbey Island (anciently Makris)
