= Airai (Ionia) =

Town of ancient Ionia

Coordinates: 38°12′16″N 26°41′09″E

Airai (Ancient Greek: Αἰραί) was a town of ancient Ionia, near Erythrae mentioned by Thucydides. It was a polis (city-state), and a member of the Delian League since it appears in tribute records of Athens between the years 454/3 and 427/6 BCE. In the year 411 BCE, during the Peloponnesian War, the Chians caused the cities of Lebedus and Airai, until then allies of Athens, to revolt against it. Then the Athenian Diomedon commanded the ten ships and attacked Airai, but was unable to take it. In Strabo's time it was a small town that belonged to Teos. Airai's silver and bronze coins dating from the 4th century BCE bearing the inscription «ΑΙΡΑΙΩΝ» survive.

Its site is located near the modern Aşağı Demirci, İzmir Province, Turkey.
