= 1904 Kresna earthquakes =

Earthquakes in Bulgaria

- Location within Bulgaria
- UTC time: 1904-04-04 10:25:34
- ISC event
- 16957813
- 610326271
- USGS-ANSS
- ComCat
- ComCat
- Local date: 4 April 1904
- Magnitude: M_{s}/M_{w} 6.9; M_{s}/M_{w} 7.2
- Depth: 15.0 km
- Epicenter: 42°26′N 23°25′E
- Areas affected: Bulgaria
- Max. intensity: MMI XI (Extreme)
- Landslides: Yes
- Casualties: 200+ dead

The 1904 Kresna earthquakes occurred on the same day of April 4 in the Kresna region of Bulgaria. The pair of earthquakes measured 6.9 and 7.2 on the surface wave magnitude scale, and were assigned the respective Modified Mercalli intensity scale ratings of X (Extreme) and XI (Extreme). More than 200 people were killed in the two earthquakes. Several villages were obliterated as a result.

== Earthquakes ==
The first shock occurred in the morning of April 4 at 11:58 local time. It had an epicenter located in the Struma River Valley between the then villages of Kresna and Krupnik. A larger mainshock occurred approximately 20 minutes later. The two earthquakes resulted in the total destruction of Simitli and Krupnik. Major damage occurred in the towns of Dzhumaya, Bansko and Razlog. The two quakes caused more than 200 deaths in its aftermath.

According to survivors of the earthquakes, farm cattle began to gather in a group and displayed signs of distress before the earthquakes struck. In Kresna, well-constructed wooden homes survived the earthquakes. Some homes suffered collapsed chimneys. In Oshtava, Stara Kresna, Breznitsa, Moravska, Mechkul, and Sarbinovo, wood homes remained intact. Due to good construction practices, the town of Krupnik lost only two or three residents. Most of the victims were from Blagoevgrad. Some mosques, however, suffered damage or total collapse. The local newspaper Dnevnik reported the destruction of six mosques, barracks, and a gunpowder warehouse.

At Banya, minimal damage occurred, with several homes and a minaret collapsing. One person in the town was killed. Chimneys and exterior walls were destroyed. Some homes were so badly damaged that they were unsafe for living. In Bansko, one home was destroyed and many other homes suffered damage. Three people died and four were injured in Razlog due to collapsed homes. Virtually every house in the southern part of town was affected. At least 100 homes in Dzumaja were demolished during the mainshock and were already damaged in the foreshock. A mosque, three minarets, the barracks, and a hospital were damaged or destroyed, killing two and leaving four wounded. A smaller extent of damage occurred in the north and eastern parts of Dzumaja. Damage to churches and homes there was quickly repaired.

Southwest of Dzumaja, in the plains, pebbles were thrown off the ground during the earthquake. Extreme degrees of shaking caused the soil to liquefy. In Gramadac and Cerovo, the devastation was nearly complete; very few homes remained intact. Despite the destruction, no casualties occurred as residents had left their homes after the foreshock. The village of Izvorite was obliterated; only three of the 200 masonry homes survived. Roads in the town were cracked or partially buried under rubble. The town lost five residents in the event. Significant loss of life was reported in Kocani and Pehcevo, where 14 and 38 deaths were recorded. Ground fissures measuring up to 2 meters wide and landslides occurred.

== Geology ==
Near the reported epicenters of the earthquakes are three active seismogenic structures with lengths ranging from 20 km to 35 km. Of the three structures in the region; the Kocani, Bansko, and Krupnik faults, the Krupnik Fault lies entirely within the meizoseismal area in published isoseismal maps. On-site field surveys have identified active fault scarps along the Krupnik Fault as well. The mainshock likely ruptured along the fault which dips 45°, and measures 20-km-long by 15-km-wide, generating a maximum slip of 2 meters. Little is known about the source of the foreshock which due to the absence of surface ruptures.

The earthquakes were previously assigned magnitudes M_{s} 7.5 and 7.8 respectively by Beno Gutenberg and Charles Francis Richter, but has since been reassessed to 6.8 and 7.2 in recent years. The mainshock still remains to be one of the largest in Europe. Both the very large foreshock and mainshock were felt over an area of 1.4 million cubic kilometers, in Romania, the Aegean Sea, Turkey, Macedonia, and Serbia.

=== Kresna earthquake sequence ===
| Time (UTC) | Latitude | Longitude | Magnitude (M_{s}) | Remarks |
|---|---|---|---|---|
| 1903-11-25 23:16 | 41.8°N | 23.4°E | 5.0 | Some localized damage. No casualties. |
| 1904-04-04 10:05 | 41.8°N | 22.7°E | 6.9 | Felt X - MMI. |
| 1904-04-04 10:28 | 41.8°N | 23.0°E | 7.2 | Felt XI - MMI. |
| 1904-04-10 08:52 | 41.9°N | 22.8°E | 6.2 | Significant damage and casualties reported. |
| 1904-04-19 08:52 | 41.9°N | 23.1°E | 5.6 | Damage reported. |
| 1905-10-08 07:27 | 41.9°N | 23.2°E | 6.4 | Damage in Dzumaja, Blagoevgrad. |

== Legacy ==
There are legends of a water cave which appeared in the Kresna Gorge shortly after the earthquakes. According to the legends, cars, and people fell into the Struma River and were sucked into the cave by the currents and never found. It is said that giant catfishs up to 4 meters long roam the cave.

== See also ==
- List of earthquakes in 1904
- List of earthquakes in Bulgaria
