= Mersinalanı =

- Neighbourhood
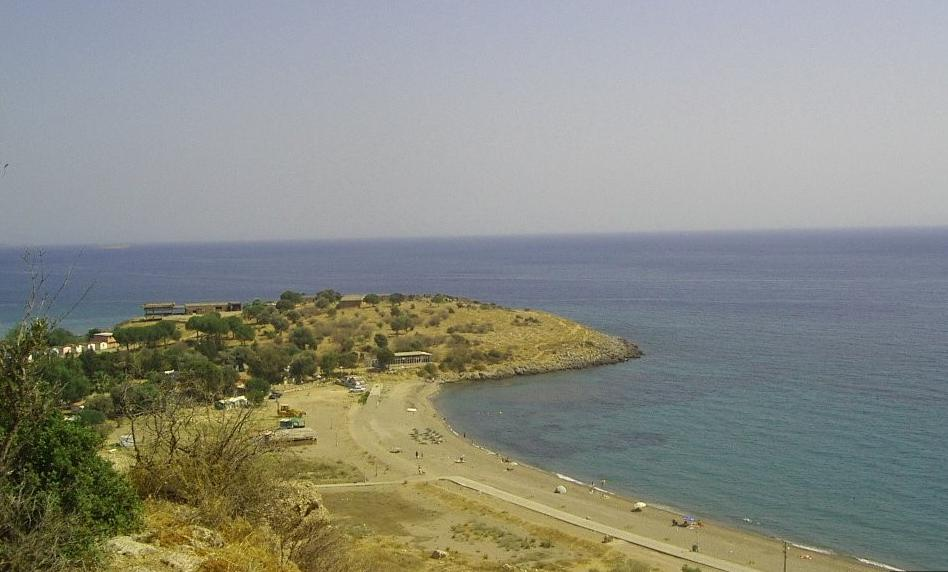
- Kısık Peninsula near Ürkmez on and around which ruins of the ancient city of Lebedos are found

- Location within Turkey Location within İzmir
- Coordinates: 38.0786°N 26.9581°E
- Country: Turkey
- Province: İzmir
- District: Seferihisar
- Population (2022): 3,141
- Time zone: UTC+3 (TRT)
- Postal code: 35485
- Area code: 0232

Mersinalanı (formerly: Ürkmez) is a neighbourhood in the municipality and district of Seferihisar, İzmir Province, Turkey. Its population is 3,141 (2022). Ürkmez was an independent municipality until it was merged into the municipality of Seferihisar in 2008.

It is a coastal holiday resort, situated at a distance of approximately 50 km from the province center of İzmir. The number of inhabitants rises to about 25,000 during the summer.

Mersinalanı is where the ancient city of Lebedos was located and there are still some traces of the historic settlement. There are also thermal springs in Mersinalanı.

== See also ==
- Lebedos
