= 1904 Douliu earthquake =

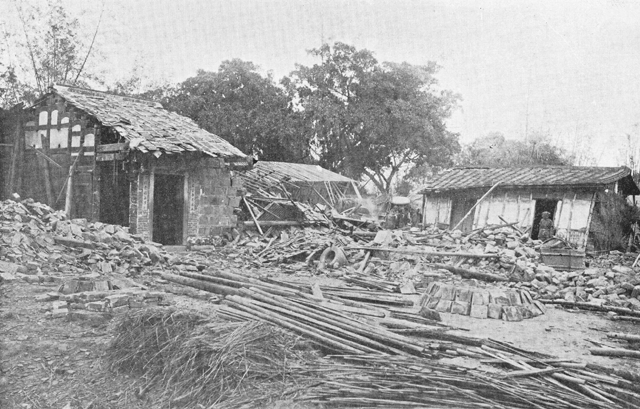

- Location within Taiwan
- UTC time: 1904-11-05 20:25
- ISC event: n/a
- USGS-ANSS: n/a
- Local date: November 6, 1904
- Local time: 04:25 am
- Magnitude: 6.1
- Depth: 7 kilometres (4 mi)
- Epicenter: 23.58°N 120.25°E
- Areas affected: Taiwan, Empire of Japan
- Casualties: 145 dead

The 1904 Douliu earthquake (Chinese: 1904年斗六地震; pinyin: 1904 nián Dǒuliù dìzhèn) struck central Taiwan with a magnitude of 6.1 at 04:25 on November 6. The quake caused widespread damage and killed 145 people, making it the fifth deadliest earthquake of the 20th century in Taiwan.

== Technical details ==
At 04:25 of the morning of 6 November 1904, a magnitude 6.1 earthquake centred on the town of Xingang, Chiayi County, shook towns in present-day Yunlin County, Chiayi County, and Tainan City. Despite the relatively light magnitude, the shallow depth of the temblor (7 km) coupled with the fact that it struck in a populated area meant that casualties were heavier than might be expected.

The earthquake was one of the first major quakes in Taiwan to be monitored using seismographs that were introduced by the Japanese. This enabled government officials to pinpoint the magnitude, epicentre and hypocentre of the earthquake with more accuracy than ever before.

The quake was felt throughout the island, and Japanese officials recorded sandblasting and soil liquefaction at several sites in the affected area.

== Damage ==
According to Taiwan's Central Weather Bureau, there were 145 deaths, with 50 people seriously injured and 107 people less seriously injured. As a result of the quake 590 dwellings were completely destroyed, while a further 1,085 dwellings were partially destroyed. The cost of damage was assessed at the time as ¥105,155 (1904 Japanese yen). The worst affected area was Shinkō subprefecture (新港支廳) (Xingang, Chiayi), where 85 of the deaths occurred.

== See also ==
- List of earthquakes in 1904
- List of earthquakes in Taiwan
