= Cıfıtkalesi Islet =

Island in İzmir Province, Turkey

Native name: Cıfıtkalesi Adası
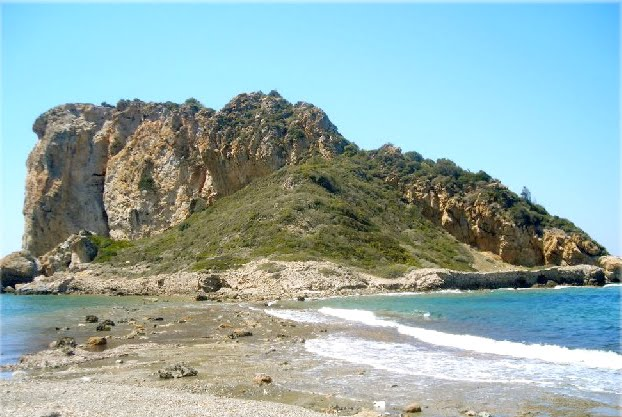
- Cıfıtkalesi

- Location within Turkey

Geography
- Coordinates: 38°02′44″N 26°51′18″E

Administration
- Turkey
- İl (province): İzmir Province
- İlçe: Seferihisar

Çıfıtkalesi Islet (literally "Jewish Castle Island") is an uninhabited Aegean islet in Turkey.

The islet is administratively a part of Seferihisar ilçe (district) of İzmir Province. It is very close to mainland (Anatolia); the closest point to mainland is less than 100 metres (330 ft). The longest dimension of the islet is about 250 metres (820 ft).

In antiquity the islet was connected to the mainland and was called Myonessus (Ancient Greek: Μυόννησος, meaning mouse island). Currently, the connection has been broken, but the sea level is shallow and it is possible to walk to the islet. Parts of the defensive wall are preserved on the island.
