= List of earthquakes in 1904 =

Earthquakes in 1904
Approximate epicenters of the earthquakes in 1904
- 4.0–5.9 magnitude
- 6.0–6.9 magnitude
- 7.0–7.9 magnitude
- 8.0+ magnitude
- Strongest magnitude: Bulgaria, Blagoevgrad Province (Magnitude 7.8) April 4
- Deadliest: Qing Dynasty, China, Sichuan Province (Magnitude 6.8) August 30 400 deaths
- Total fatalities: 552

Number by magnitude
- 9.0+: 0

This is a list of earthquakes in 1904. Only magnitude 6.0 or greater earthquakes appear on the list. Exceptions to this are earthquakes which have caused death, injury or damage. Events which occurred in remote areas will be excluded from the list as they wouldn't have generated significant media interest. All dates are listed according to UTC time. The countries and their flags are noted as they would have appeared in this year for example the Dutch East Indies being present-day Indonesia. Once again activity was below average. 14 events reached a magnitude of 7.0+ this year. China had the majority of the death toll through an event in August causing 400 deaths.

== Overall ==
=== By death toll ===
Rank	Death toll	Magnitude	Location	MMI	Depth (km)	Date
1	400	6.8	Qing Dynasty, China, Sichuan Province	VIII (Severe)	0.0	August 30
2	145	6.3	Japan, Taiwan, Chiayi County	( )	0.0	November 5

- Note: At least 10 casualties

=== By magnitude ===
Rank	Magnitude	Death toll	Location	MMI	Depth (km)	Date
1	7.8	0	Bulgaria, Blagoevgrad Province	XI (Extreme)	15.0	April 4
2	7.7	0	Russian Empire, off east coast of Kamchatka	X (Extreme)	0.0	June 25
= 3	7.5	0	Bulgaria, Blagoevgrad Province	X (Extreme)	0.0	April 4
= 3	7.5	0	Russian Empire, off east coast of Kamchatka	X (Extreme)	0.0	June 25
4	7.4	0	Japan, Sea of Japan	( )	350.0	June 7
5	7.3	0	United States, central Alaska	VI (Strong)	0.0	August 27
= 6	7.2	0	Panama, south of	( )	0.0	January 20
= 6	7.2	0	Russian Empire, off east coast of Kamchatka	IX (Violent)	0.0	June 27
= 6	7.2	0	Costa Rica, Puntarenas Province	( )	0.0	December 20
7	7.1	0	Japan, south of Kyushu	( )	35.0	August 24
= 8	7.0	0	Chile, Atacama Region	( )	0.0	March 19
= 8	7.0	0	Dutch East Indies, Halmahera	( )	0.0	May 1
= 8	7.0	0	Owen fracture zone	( )	0.0	October 3
= 8	7.0	0	South China Sea	( )	0.0	October 28

- Note: At least 7.0 magnitude

== Notable events ==
=== January ===
January
- Strongest magnitude: 7.2 M_{w} Panama
- Total fatalities: 0

Number by magnitude
- 8.0–8.9: 0
- 7.0–7.9: 1
- 6.0–6.9: 0

Date	Country and location	M_{w}	Depth (km)	MMI	Notes	Casualties	
Date	Country and location	M_{w}	Depth (km)	MMI	Notes	Dead	Injured
20	Panama, south of	7.2	0.0		Depth unknown.		

=== March ===
March
- Strongest magnitude: 7.0 M_{w} Chile
- Total fatalities: 0

Number by magnitude
- 8.0–8.9: 0
- 7.0–7.9: 1
- 6.0–6.9: 1

Date	Country and location	M_{w}	Depth (km)	MMI	Notes	Casualties	
Date	Country and location	M_{w}	Depth (km)	MMI	Notes	Dead	Injured
18	Japan, southeast of Hokkaido	6.8	35.0	X	Some damage was reported.		
19	Chile, Atacama Region	7.0	0.0				

=== April ===
April
- Strongest magnitude: 7.8 M_{w} Bulgaria
- Deadliest: 6.0 M_{w} Japan; 3 deaths
- Total fatalities: 3

Number by magnitude
- 8.0–8.9: 0
- 7.0–7.9: 2
- 6.0–6.9: 1

Date	Country and location	M_{w}	Depth (km)	MMI	Notes	Casualties	
Date	Country and location	M_{w}	Depth (km)	MMI	Notes	Dead	Injured
4	Bulgaria, Blagoevgrad Province	7.5	15.0	X	First shock in the 1904 Kresna earthquakes. Major damage was reported. Several villages were flattened. Foreshock.		
4	Bulgaria, Blagoevgrad Province	7.8	15.0	XI	Second shock in the 1904 Kresna earthquakes. Further damage was reported.		
24	Japan, Taiwan, Chiayi County	6.0	0.0		3 people were killed and 10 were injured. 66 homes were destroyed.	3	10

=== May ===
May
- Strongest magnitude: 7.0 M_{w} Dutch East Indies
- Total fatalities: 0

Number by magnitude
- 8.0–8.9: 0
- 7.0–7.9: 1
- 6.0–6.9: 1

Date	Country and location	M_{w}	Depth (km)	MMI	Notes	Casualties	
Date	Country and location	M_{w}	Depth (km)	MMI	Notes	Dead	Injured
1	New Zealand, south of the Kermadec Islands	6.8	0.0		Depth unknown.		
1	Dutch East Indies, Halmahera	7.0	0.0		Depth unknown.		

=== June ===
June
- Strongest magnitude: 7.7 M_{w} Russian Empire
- Total fatalities: 0

Number by magnitude
- 8.0–8.9: 0
- 7.0–7.9: 4
- 6.0–6.9: 0

Date	Country and location	M_{w}	Depth (km)	MMI	Notes	Casualties	
Date	Country and location	M_{w}	Depth (km)	MMI	Notes	Dead	Injured
7	Japan, Sea of Japan	7.4	350.0				
25	Russian Empire, off the east coast of Kamchatka	7.5	15.0	X	Some damage was caused. Foreshock.		
25	Russian Empire, off the east coast of Kamchatka	7.7	30.0	X	Further damage was caused.		
27	Russian Empire, off the east coast of Kamchatka	7.2	0.0	IX	Aftershock. Depth unknown.		

=== July ===
July
- Strongest magnitude: 6.7 M_{w} Russian Empire
- Total fatalities: 0

Number by magnitude
- 8.0–8.9: 0
- 7.0–7.9: 0
- 6.0–6.9: 1

Date	Country and location	M_{w}	Depth (km)	MMI	Notes	Casualties	
Date	Country and location	M_{w}	Depth (km)	MMI	Notes	Dead	Injured
24	Russian Empire, off the east coast of Kamchatka	6.7	0.0		Aftershock. Depth unknown.		

=== August ===
August
- Strongest magnitude: 7.3 M_{w} United States
- Deadliest: 6.8 M_{w} Qing Dynasty; 400 deaths
- Total fatalities: 400

Number by magnitude
- 8.0–8.9: 0
- 7.0–7.9: 2
- 6.0–6.9: 3

Date	Country and location	M_{w}	Depth (km)	MMI	Notes	Casualties	
Date	Country and location	M_{w}	Depth (km)	MMI	Notes	Dead	Injured
8	New Zealand, east of	6.9	0.0		Depth unknown.		
11	Greece, Samos	6.2	10.0	X	The 1904 Samos earthquake caused 4 deaths. Around 540 homes were damaged or destroyed.	4	
24	Japan, south of Kyushu	7.1	35.0				
27	United States, central Alaska	7.3	0.0	VI	Depth unknown.		
30	Qing Dynasty, China, Sichuan Province	6.8	0.0	VIII	400 deaths were caused as well as major damage. Depth unknown.	400	

=== October ===
October
- Strongest magnitude: 7.0 M_{w} 2 events
- Total fatalities: 0

Number by magnitude
- 8.0–8.9: 0
- 7.0–7.9: 2
- 6.0–6.9: 0

Date	Country and location	M_{w}	Depth (km)	MMI	Notes	Casualties	
Date	Country and location	M_{w}	Depth (km)	MMI	Notes	Dead	Injured
3	Owen fracture zone	7.0	0.0		Depth unknown.		
28	South China Sea	7.0	0.0		Depth unknown.		

=== November ===
November
- Strongest magnitude: 6.3 M_{w} (Japan) Taiwan
- Deadliest: 6.3 M_{w} (Japan) Taiwan; 145 deaths
- Total fatalities: 145

Number by magnitude
- 8.0–8.9: 0
- 7.0–7.9: 0
- 6.0–6.9: 1

Date	Country and location	M_{w}	Depth (km)	MMI	Notes	Casualties	
Date	Country and location	M_{w}	Depth (km)	MMI	Notes	Dead	Injured
5	Japan, Taiwan, Chiayi County	6.3	0.0		145 people were killed in the 1904 Douliu earthquake. Another 158 were injured and 661 homes were destroyed. Depth unknown.	145	158

=== December ===
December
- Strongest magnitude: 7.2 M_{w} Costa Rica
- Total fatalities: 0

Number by magnitude
- 8.0–8.9: 0
- 7.0–7.9: 1
- 6.0–6.9: 1

Date	Country and location	M_{w}	Depth (km)	MMI	Notes	Casualties	
Date	Country and location	M_{w}	Depth (km)	MMI	Notes	Dead	Injured
20	Costa Rica, Puntarenas Province	7.2	0.0		Depth unknown.		
27	Japan, Izu Islands	6.7	100.0				
