= 2020 Aegean Sea earthquake =

7.0 magnitude earthquake and tsunami affecting Turkey and Greece

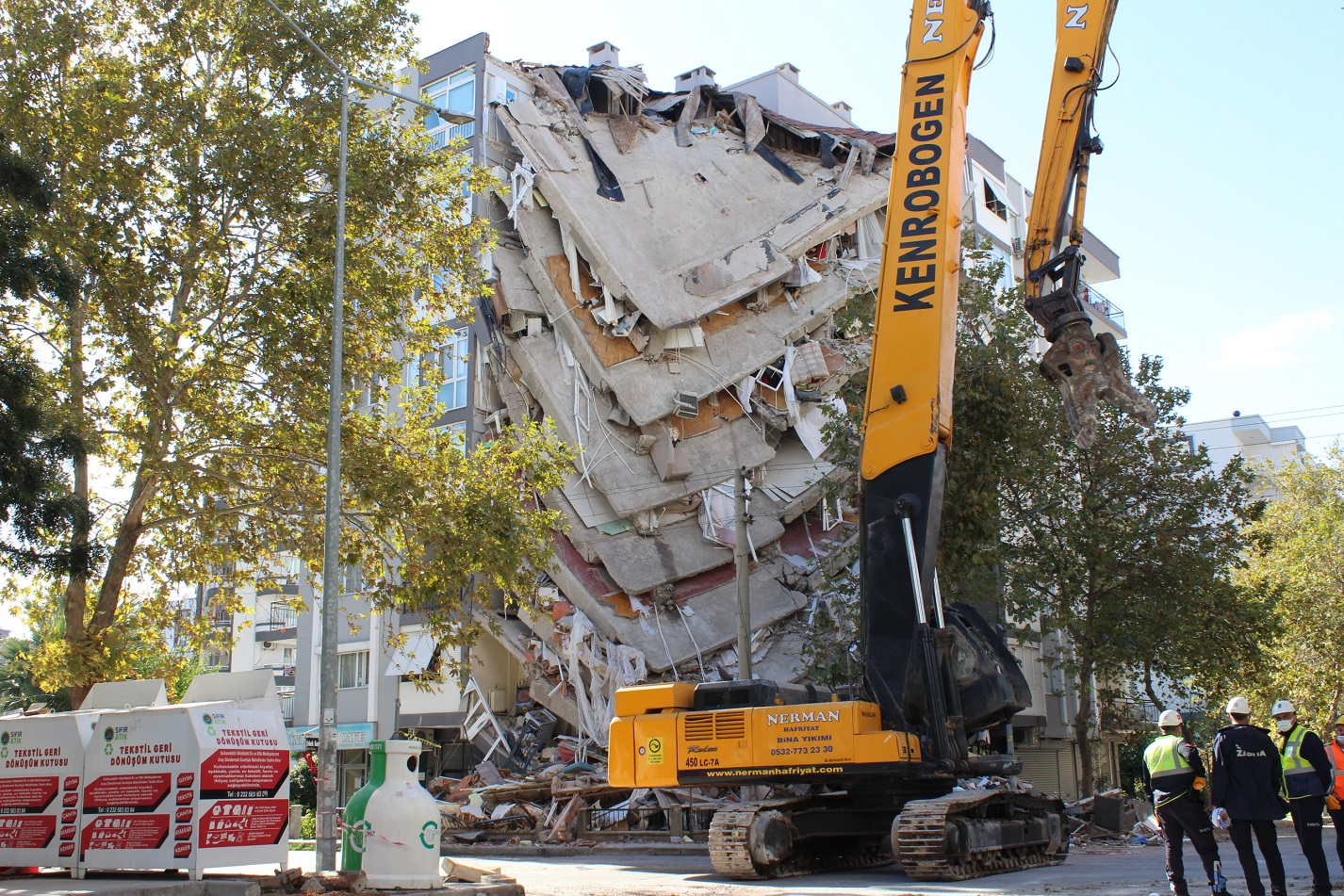
- The partially collapsed Doğanlar Apartment where 15 people died
- UTC time: 2020-10-30 11:51:26
- ISC event: 619514791
- USGS-ANSS: ComCat
- Local date: 30 October 2020
- Local time: 14:51 TRT (UTC+3)
- Duration: 16 seconds
- Magnitude: 7.0 M_{w}
- Depth: 16.1 km (10.0 mi)
- Epicentre: 37.918°N 26.790°E East Aegean Sea
- Type: Normal
- Areas affected: Turkey, Greece
- Total damage: > $400 million
- Max. intensity: MMI VIII (Severe)
- Peak acceleration: 0.98 g
- Tsunami: 5.6–6 m (18–20 ft)
- Foreshocks: Three months prior
- Aftershocks: 2,800+ recorded
- Casualties: 119 dead, 1,053 injured, 15,000 homeless

An earthquake with a moment magnitude of 7.0 (Note: It was frequently misreported as 6.6 M_{ww} by the Turkish media due to an erroneous announcement by the AFAD.) occurred on 30 October 2020 about 14 km (8.7 mi) northeast of the Greek island of Samos. Although Samos was closest to the epicentre, it was the large Turkish city İzmir, 70 km (43 mi) northeast that was heavily affected—more than 700 residential and commercial structures were seriously damaged or destroyed. One hundred and seventeen people died in İzmir Province while an additional 1,034 were injured. In Greece, there were two fatalities and 19 injured. The earthquake is the deadliest in the year 2020, and the third major earthquake to strike Turkey that year. It generated an unusually large tsunami. The event is called the Samos earthquake by the International Seismological Centre.

== Tectonic setting ==
A plate tectonics map of the Mediterranean Sea. The earthquake occurred within a zone of extension in the Aegean Sea shown by the arrows.

The Aegean Sea is a seismically active region with complex plate tectonics interaction both within and surrounding the Aegean Sea plate. The region has several major plate boundary including the North Anatolian Fault which runs through northern Turkey, where the Anatolian sub-plate slides past the Eurasian plate along this right-lateral strike-slip fault. Another major boundary is the East Anatolian Fault where the Arabian plate interacts with the Anatolian plate. This transform fault was responsible for the 2020 Elazığ earthquake.

At its southern edge, the African plate converges north towards the Aegean Sea plate at a rate of 5–10 mm (0.20–0.39 in)/yr. It subducts beneath the Aegean, occasionally producing great megathrust earthquakes and tsunamis including the 365 Crete earthquake. The subduction rate along the Hellenic subduction zone at 35 mm (1.4 in)/yr, however, greatly exceeds the velocity of the African plate. North–south extension within the Aegean Sea plate in the back-arc region compensate the subduction rate. Shallow crustal earthquakes within the Aegean Sea plate is a result of this extension, accommodated by east–west trending normal faults.

The first record of an earthquake in the Samos and İzmir region date back to 200 BC, describing an earthquake of magnitude 6.0–6.5, and intensity VII–VIII. Another earthquake with an estimated magnitude of 7.0 struck the region in 47 AD. On the island of Samos, these earthquakes have minimal effects. However, nearby İzmir have suffered serious catastrophe as a result of these earthquakes. The most destructive event in the region was the 1688 Smyrna earthquake, which had an epicentre near İzmir. With an estimated magnitude 7.0, the earthquake killed 15,000–20,000 people in the city. Other major events took place in 1739 and 1788, causing major damage in the city. On 11 August 1904, Samos was rocked by a magnitude 6.8 earthquake, causing substantial damage in Greece and Turkey, and killing four people. That earthquake according to researchers, was caused by an onshore fault (Pythagorion Fault) on the island.

== Earthquake ==
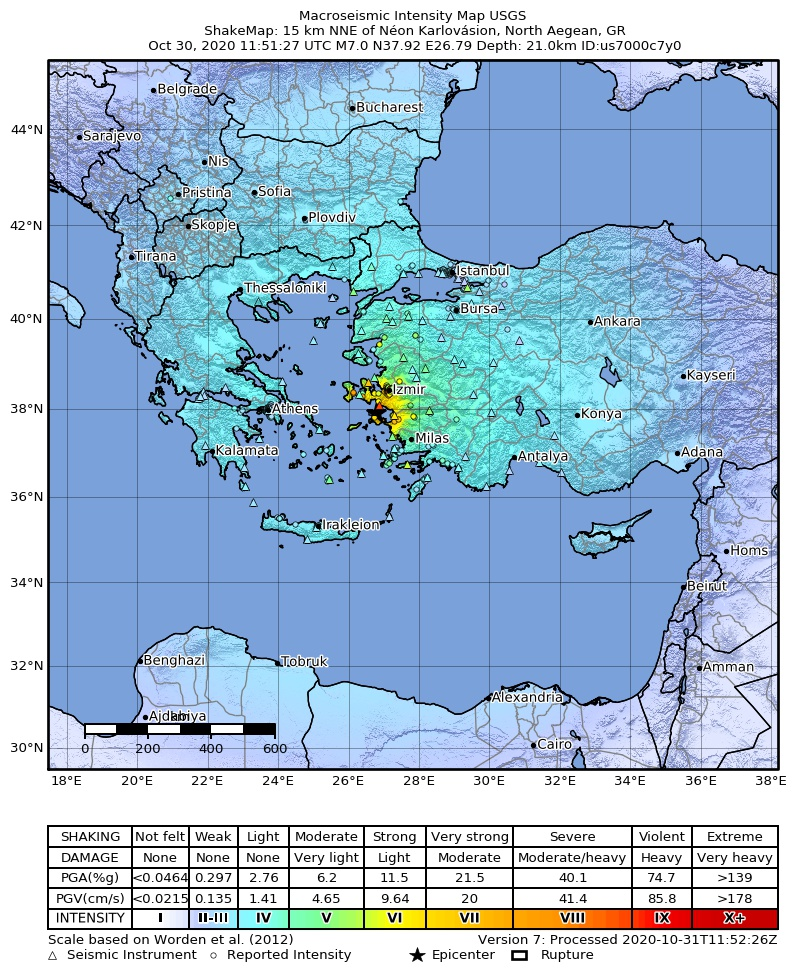
USGS ShakeMap for the earthquake

The earthquake was the result of normal faulting at a shallow crustal depth within the Aegean Sea plate in the eastern Aegean Sea, about 250 km (160 mi) north of the closest plate boundary, the Hellenic Trench, where the African plate moves north at a rate of approximately 10 mm (0.39 in)/yr with respect to the Eurasian plate. Due to its geological setting away from a plate boundary, it is considered an intraplate earthquake. A focal mechanism analysis indicated that the earthquake occurred on a moderately dipping normal fault striking either eastward or westward. This mechanism indicates north–south oriented extension that is common in the Aegean Sea. The United States Geological Survey stated that normal faulting events of this size typically have a fault area of 50 km (31 mi) x 20 km (12 mi).

The North Samos Fault, also known as the Kaystrios Fault, is an east–west striking, north–northeast dipping normal fault located offshore, north of the coast of Samos. The fault was previously determined to have the potential to produce an earthquake of magnitude 6.8. It likely ruptured entirely during the earthquake for a length of approximately 60 km (37 mi). The epicentral location suggests it was on the western extension of the geologically active Büyük Menderes Graben. The earthquake released a seismic moment of 3.3 × 10^{19} N-m, corresponding to a moment magnitude of 7.0. A maximum slip of 4.6 m (15 ft) at a depth of 7 km (4.3 mi) was inferred. The earthquake produced up to 1 m (3 ft 3 in) of slip on the seafloor, causing a moderate tsunami, and tectonic uplift and subsidence on land.

=== Strong ground motion ===
Modified Mercalli intensities in selected locations
MMI	Locations
MMI VIII (Severe)	Samos
MMI VI (Strong)–MMI VII (Very strong)	Gümüldür Atatürk, Kuşadası, Seferihisar, Sığacık, Bayraklı
MMI V (Moderate)	Balıklıova, Manisa
MMI IV (Light)	Sarıkemer

The earthquake achieved a peak ground acceleration (pga) of 0.27 g in Samos. Weaker ground acceleration was recorded at 0.1 g in İzmir, however, in the Bayraklı and Karşıyaka metropolitan districts, these ground motions were amplified with longer periods of 1.5 seconds. Ground motions were severely amplified in these districts due to the soil condition consisting of loose sediments. In the Turkish town of Kuşadası, the pga was 0.18 g. At 22.27 km (13.84 mi) away from the epicentre, on Turkish soil, the highest pga was recorded 0.98 g. The maximum intensity was recorded on Samos Island, VIII (Severe), a revision from X (Extreme). Shaking was also felt on the Greek island of Crete, and in some regions of Athens.

=== Foreshocks and aftershocks ===
The earthquake was preceded by a foreshock sequence consisting of 39 events beginning three months prior to the mainshock. Within the first month, more than 1,800 aftershocks measured M_{L} 2.0 or larger. More than 40 aftershock were larger than M_{w} 4.0; the largest measuring M_{w} 5.2 and 5.1. These aftershocks were distributed across a 70 km (43 mi) trend striking east–west. The aftershock distribution illuminated a fault plane dipping north, consistent with a known offshore fault structure. The low aftershock activity within the critical asperity that ruptured possibly indicated a near-total strain release during the mainshock.

=== Geological effects ===
The earthquake produced significant coseismic uplift on the island of Samos. Surface ruptures were also observed on the island. The beaches, ports, and coasts of Samos were partially raised in the aftermath. At Karlovasi, up to 24 cm (9.4 in) of permanent uplift was measured at a breakwater off the coast. Approximately 1.5 km (0.93 mi) west of Karlovasi is the Akra coast consisting of marble, which was raised 20 cm. Between 15 cm (5.9 in) and 20 cm (7.9 in) of uplift was measured at Ayios Nikolaos, located 12 km (7.5 mi) southwest of the epicentre. An aftershock measuring M_{w} 4.5 on 20 January 2021 generated 8–10 cm (3.1–3.9 in) of additional uplift in the same area. Similar measurements were taken at a marina in Marathokampos. The Pythagoreio Fault in Pythagoreio, 29 km (18 mi) southeast of the earthquake, generated 29 cm (11 in) of surface deformation during the quake. An estimated uplift of 25 cm (9.8 in) is thought to have occurred at Potokaki as reported by tourists. According to the Earth Applied Sciences Disasters Program of NASA, synthetic-aperture radar data revealed Samos Island was raised by as much as 10 cm (3.9 in) meanwhile its northern coast subsided by the same amount. The ground uplift and subsidence pattern suggested a coseismic rupture along a fault located north of the island, dipping at an angle towards the north.

Small normal-mechanism surface ruptures were documented near the villages of Kontakaiika, Ayios Nikolaos, and Ayios Elias. Vertical displacements of up to 8 cm (3.1 in) were observed on the ground, and across roads. The coseismic surface ruptures resulted in some damage to roads and brick walls. Although these uplifts were on the order of several centimeters, it added up to a length of 1 km (0.62 mi).

Small landslides, rockfalls and slope failures were reported along fault scarps on Samos. Some instances of rockfalls caused minor traffic disruption when they partially blocked roads. A small rockfall caused slight damage to an adjacent building in Kokkari. Ground cracks appeared on a road at Malagari. The cracked caused part of the road, and small trees to slide several centimeters closer to the shore as a result of lateral spreading. Minor liquefaction occurred at the beach near the town as well.

== Tsunami ==
Tsunami information was issued by the Kandilli Observatory Earthquake Monitoring and Tsunami Warning Center to the Earthquake Research Department of Turkey approximately 11 minutes after the earthquake, but was not broadcast to the coastal regions. The tsunami arrived between 10 and 15 minutes after the mainshock.

Multiple social media posts showed water rushing through streets and ports in the region following the earthquake, along with tsunami warnings being issued for the islands of Ikaria, Kos, Chios and Samos. Flooding from the coasts reached heights of 1.9 m (6 ft 3 in), however at Akarca, the tsunami reached heights of 6 m (20 ft). In Azmak, the tsunami penetrated 1.3 km (0.81 mi) inland, 0.82 km (0.51 mi) in Akarca, and 0.32 km (0.20 mi) in Sigacik. Recorded heights of the tsunami from this event were larger than those of other similar magnitude earthquakes in the same region with the exception of the 1956 Amorgos earthquake.

Damage to buildings caused by the tsunami in Greece and Turkey was moderate and non-structural. The tsunami produced unusually long basin oscillations, persisting for over a day after the earthquake. The earthquake itself generated an unusually large tsunami for its magnitude and normal focal mechanism.

In Akarca, north of Samos, the tsunami had a run-up height of 3.8 m (12 ft), inundated up to 290 m (950 ft) inland. The maximum wave height in this area was 6 m (20 ft). A 2.2 m (7 ft 3 in) surge flooded and damaged a diving center near the coast. Garden walls and fences along the shore were also damaged. Cars and boats were among the large objects picked up by the surge and moved inland. The only known tsunami fatality was reported in this town.

In Alaçatı on the Çeşme Peninsula, the tsunami flowed up a stream and inundated inland by as much as 2.49 km (1.55 mi). It carried a fishing vessel 1.16 km (0.72 mi) along the stream during the inundation. Analysis of video footage on the coast showed that the tsunami had a maximum height of 1.7 m (5 ft 7 in) when it struck.

East of Alaçatı, in Zeytineli, the tsunami severely damaged unoccupied resort houses along a stretch of beach. Debris from damaged structures were strewn along the beach. Concrete blocks were also displaced by as much as 25 m (82 ft). A maximum inundation of 760 m (2,490 ft) was measured, as well as a flow height of 1.9 m (6 ft 3 in) at a palm tree, 50 m (160 ft) from the shore. At Sığacık, a wave struck the coast with a run-up height of 5.0–5.6 m (16.4–18.4 ft). The tsunami waves were higher in this region due to the presence of a shallow bay which altered the coastal geometry.

Major flooding occurred along the northern coast of Samos although there were no deaths. Many offices and businesses were immediately flooded when the surge broke through windows and doors. Waves of 1.5–2.0 m (4 ft 11 in – 6 ft 7 in) traveled as far as 101 m (331 ft) inland. Damage to boats and cars were widely reported in the aftermath. A number of small boats and cars were carried inland or lost at sea by the tsunami. Some boats were smashed along breakwater structures as well. Shops, hotel lobbies, restaurants, offices and homes suffered slight damage when the tsunami inundated the ground level and indoors. A maximum run-up height of 3.35 m (11.0 ft) was measured on the northern coast of Samos about 5.8 km (3.6 mi) east of Karlovasi Port. The tsunami caused some material damage to a home that was located at the coast.

== Impact ==
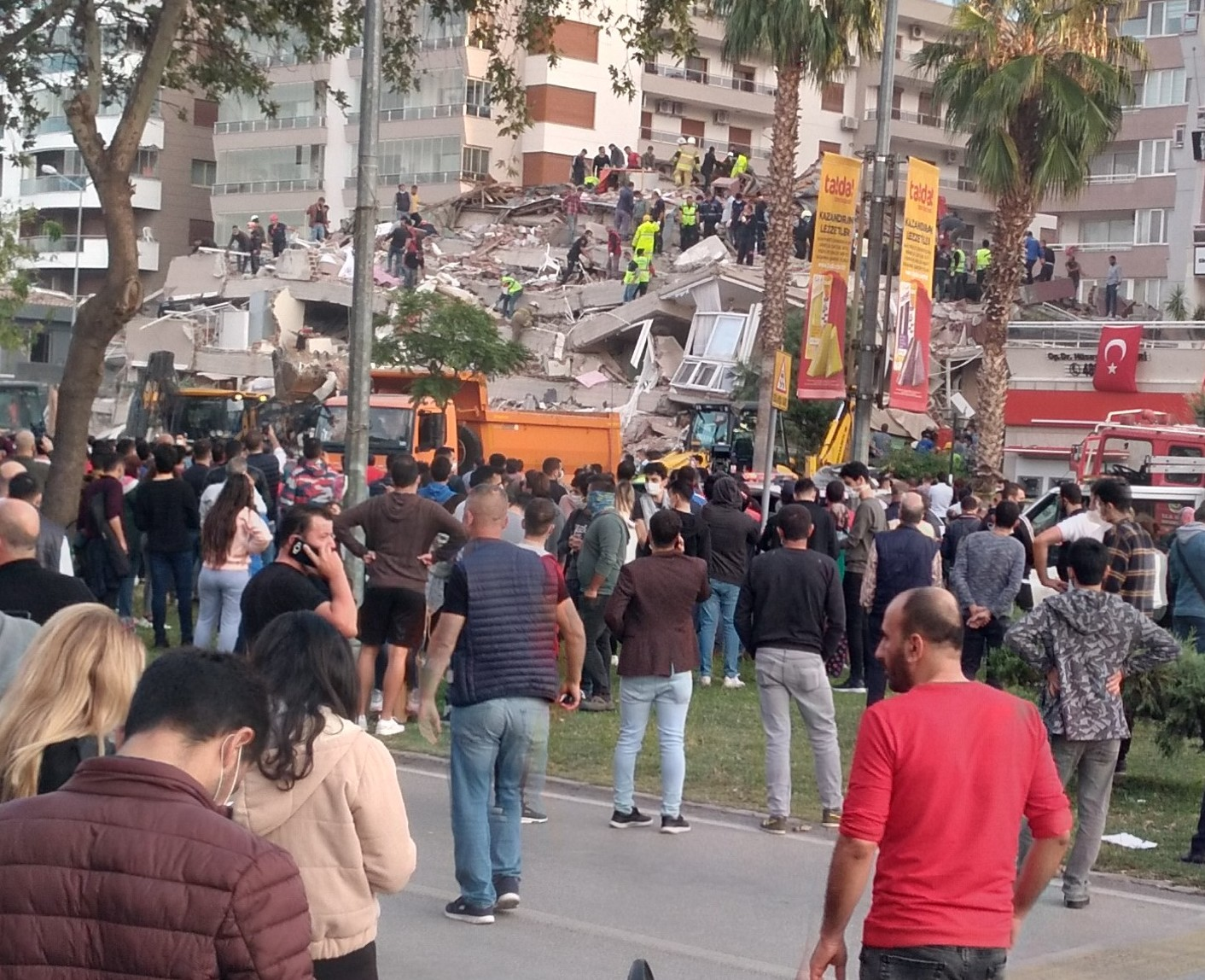
At least 36 died when the Riza Bey Apartment collapsed.

Overall, minor damage occurred on Samos despite its close proximity to the epicentre. Most of the damage and casualties were from the Bornova and Bayraklı districts of İzmir; located at least 70 km (43 mi) north of the epicentre. On 4 November, the mayor of İzmir, Tunç Soyer, stated that 15,000 people in the city were made homeless. Total damage is estimated to be in the millions for Greece, and over $400 million for Turkey. Serious structural damage and pancake-style building collapses caused many deaths in İzmir.

=== Turkey ===
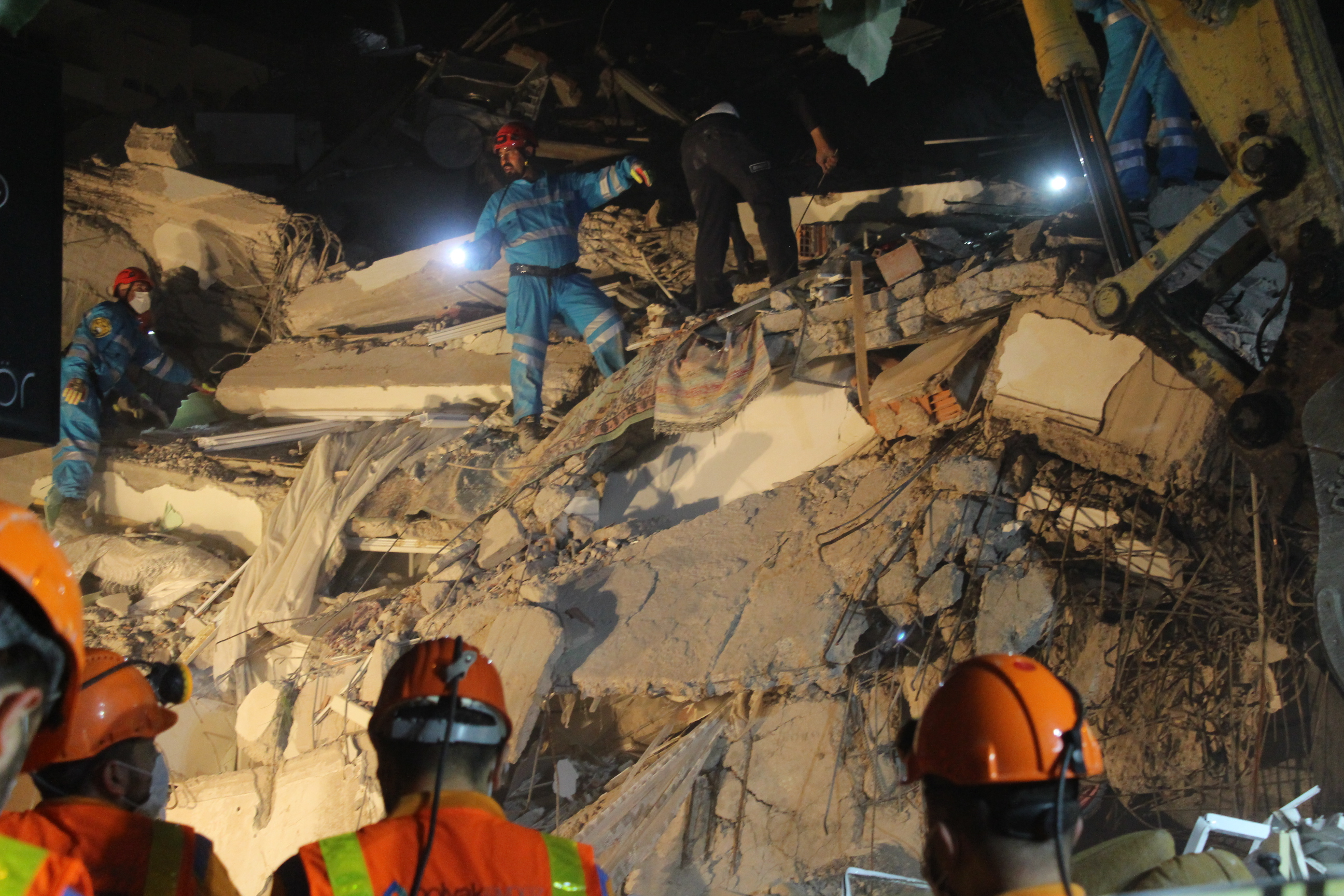
Emergency services attend to the scene of a collapsed apartment in İzmir.

Initially, Turkish Minister of the Interior Süleyman Soylu stated that at least six buildings were destroyed in İzmir, but the city's mayor Tunç Soyer later put the number of collapsed buildings closer to 20. On-site investigations by the Turkish Ministry of Environment and Urbanization revised the number of collapsed and intentionally demolished buildings to 103. At least 700 other buildings suffered serious damage, and in 814, damage was moderate. Slight structural damage was reported in across 7,889 buildings, while the other 159,000 were unaffected. Thirty-five buildings were set for demolition, and by 2023, all but two buildings were in the process of removal. Fifty-eight damaged buildings did not receive the approval for demolition due to their cultural status.

Most of the buildings that collapsed were built in the 1990s, based on outdated earthquake regulations from 1975. Poor construction practices and the absence of code compliance were reasons for the collapse. The buildings that totally failed were typically between 5–10 storeys tall, and at least 30 years old. Additionally, the first floors of these buildings were altered for commercial use such as shops. Taller buildings with heights of 100–240 m (330–790 ft), however, did not sustain structural damages. The city is also built on soft sediments in a basin which amplified the intensity of shaking despite its distance from the epicentre. The effects of basin amplification may have worsened the intensity of ground motions, causing structural failures. The observation of damage effects and instrumental data found that ground motions were amplified 2.5–3 times in the İzmir basin.

=== Greece ===
Greek authorities from Samos stated that although buildings were damaged across the island, the worst sustained was in Karlovasi, where a large church had partially collapsed. In Karlovasi, over 100 buildings were damaged upon inspection.

On-site inspections of buildings on the island began hours after the earthquake, and ended on 15 November. Of the 4,245 buildings inspected, 57 percent were declared unsafe for inhabitation. At least 87 percent of damaged buildings were of masonry construction while 6 percent were of reinforced concrete types. Damage mostly consisted of partial collapse or shear cracks. Churches and other religious buildings suffered significant but repairable damage in the quake. Archeological sites and items of historical value were damaged, some of which beyond repair. At the Archaeological Museum of Pythagorion, vessels and sculptures were destroyed. The perimeter wall of the Lycurgus Logothetis castle suffered partial collapses. A crack appeared in the marble structure of the Archaeological Museum of Vathy.

=== Casualties ===
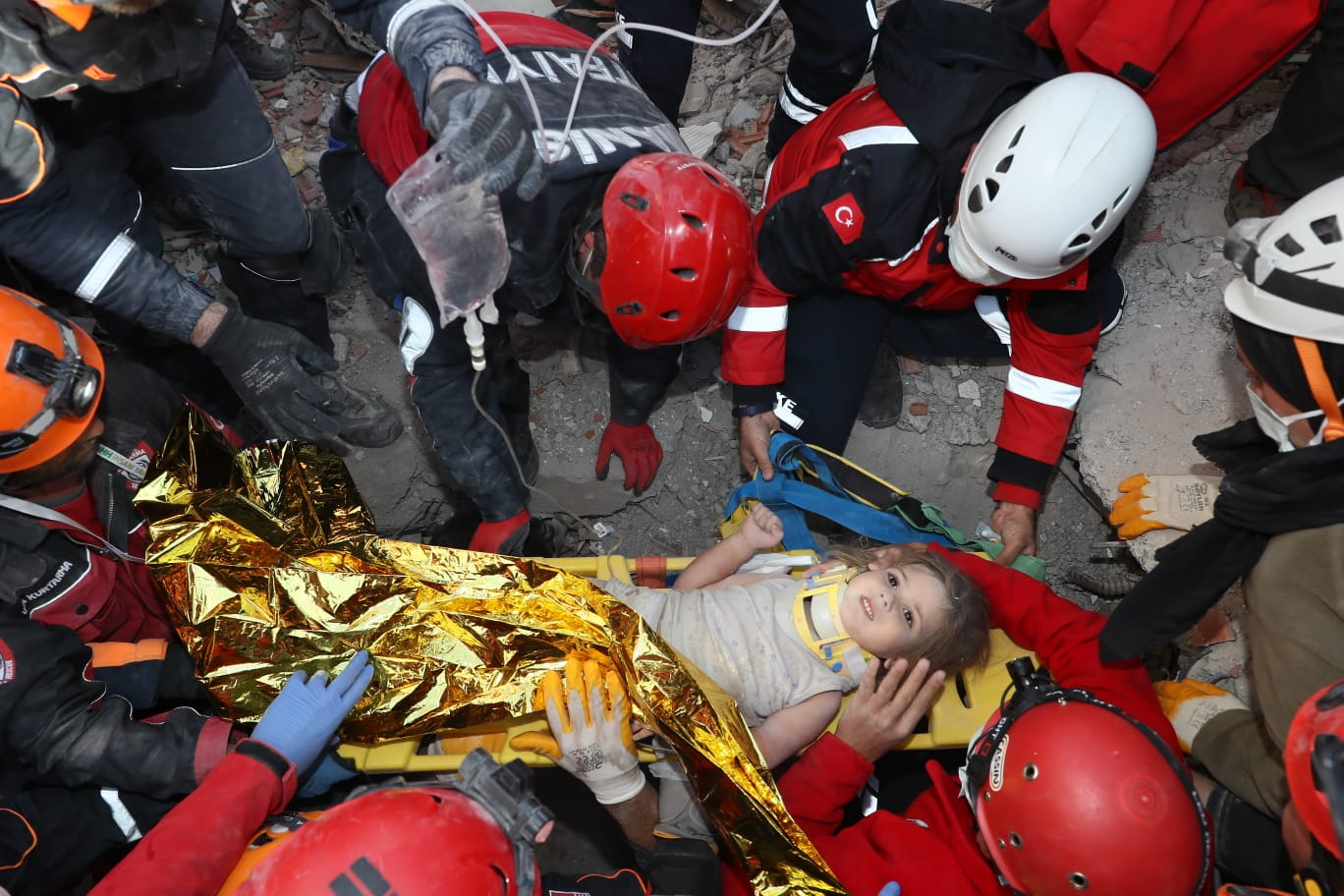
A child rescued alive from a collapsed building

Collapsed apartments accounted for nearly all 117 deaths in Turkey. Among the deadliest collapse involved the Rıza Bey Apartment, where 38 people died. Only one death occurred outside İzmir. The other Turkish victim outside İzmir died from drowning in the advancing tsunami in the district of Seferihisar. Two teenagers died in Greece after being crushed by a wall on the island of Samos; 19 others were injured in Greece. These were the first earthquake-related fatalities in Greece since 2017.

== Relief operations ==
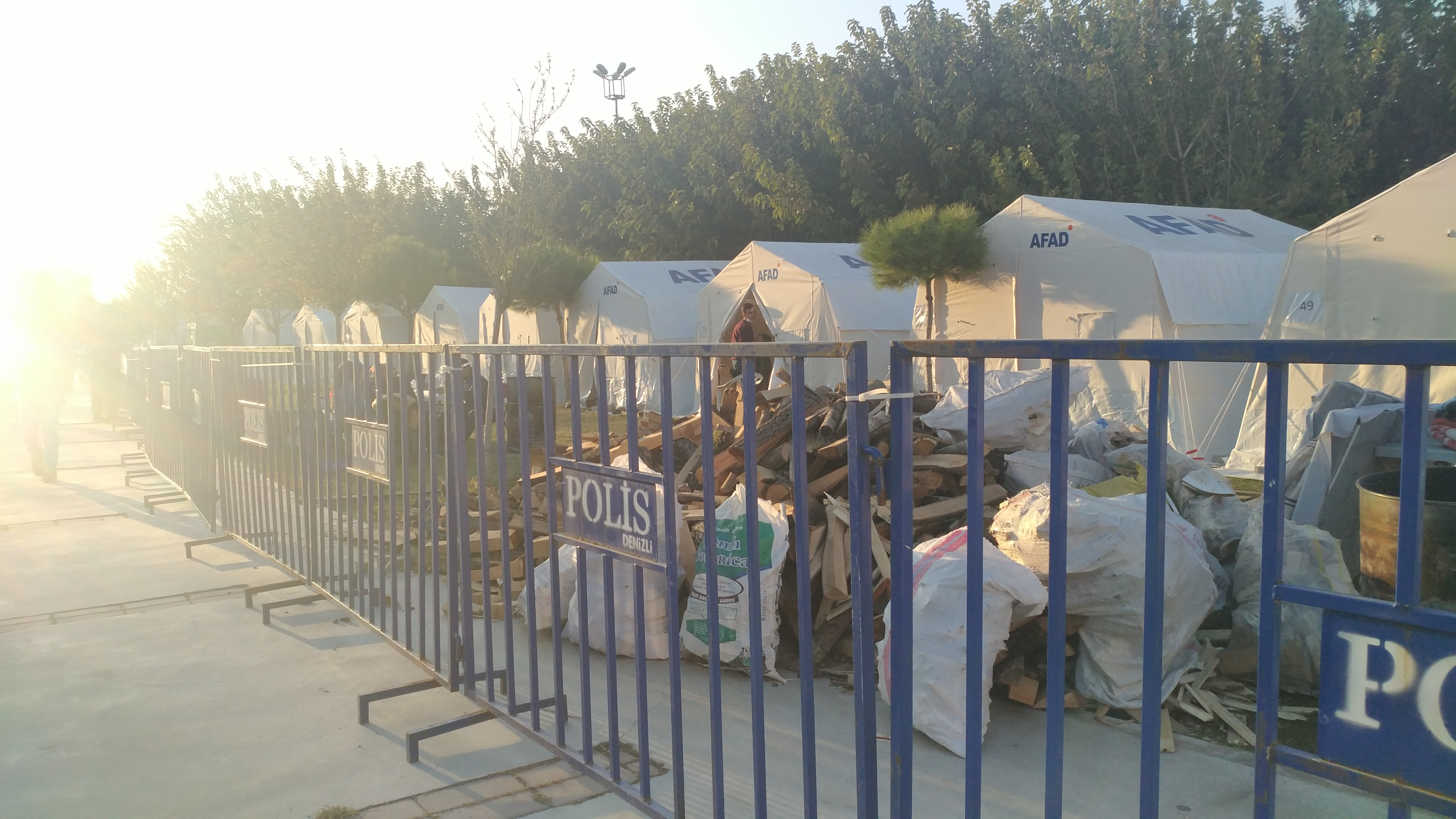
Tents set up by the Disaster and Emergency Management Presidency in İzmir for people affected by the earthquake.

Immediately after the earthquake, Turkish Minister of Health Fahrettin Koca stated that about 40 ambulances, 35 emergency rescue teams and two ambulance helicopters had reached the affected region, while Turkey's Ministry of National Defence stated that one of its planes had departed from Etimesgut Air Base to transport AFAD and gendarmerie teams to the scene. The Turkish Red Crescent immediately deployed teams from six cities to provide food to those affected by the earthquake. More than 1,200 workers were involved in rescue efforts involving at least 13 buildings in İzmir, which continued into the night. According to Al Jazeera, the personnel involved in the rescue operations had reached about 8,000, including 25 search and rescue dogs. Turkish authorities stated that 106 people were rescued, while the local government had set up tents to house about 2,000 people overnight. On 3 November, a three-year-old girl was rescued from an eight-story building—a toddler was rescued after being trapped in another building for 65 hours a day before. A total of 17 collapsed buildings were part of the search and rescue operations, according to Mehmet Gulluoglu, head of Turkey's Disaster and Emergency Management Presidency (AFAD).

== Criminal investigation ==
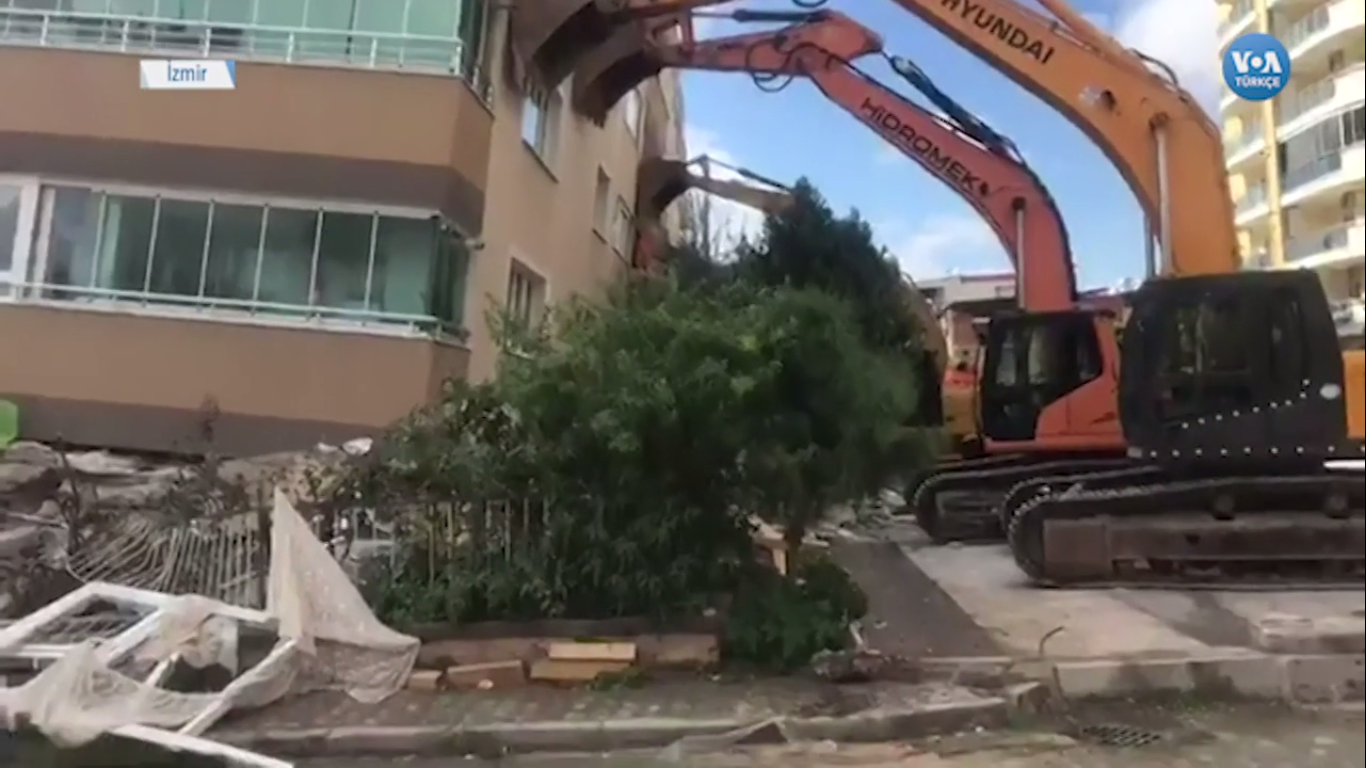
Barış Apartman supported from tipping over by excavators

Following the deadly 1999 İzmit earthquake which killed 17,000 people, Turkey has stepped-up its measures on building codes in respond to earthquakes. These have increased the safety of newer buildings during seismic events. An earthquake tax was established that same year to make infrastructures more resistant to earthquakes.

Among the residential apartments which suffered structural damage was the Yılmaz Erbek Apartment located in the Bayraklı metropolitan district. The 10-storey apartment partially collapsed, destroying the first few floors, killing 11 residents and injuring another 11. An investigation by the İzmir Chief Public Prosecutor's Office found that poor construction materials and practices, and the lack of inspections led to its collapse. During renovation works in the 2000s, the ground floor was renovated for a supermarket. Seven of the nine workspaces in the first floor were combined, which meant columns were deliberately cut to make space for the supermarket. An exterior wall of the structure was also torn down for a window. A total of five indictments were filed against 29 individuals; 10 of whom have been imprisoned. Several public officials were also accused of neglect of duty in the role of the collapse.

Another four individuals were involved in a lawsuit for their roles in the collapse of the Doğanlar Apartment that killed 15 and injured 12. Two of the accused were detained by authorities for "causing the death and injury of more than one person by conscious negligence", and could face jail time of up to 20 years. Officials also arrested individuals involved in the construction of the Rıza Bey Apartment.

== International reactions ==
Countries:

- United States
  - The US embassy has shared their condolences for the dead and wounded in the earthquake.
- Germany – The German embassy in Ankara has shared the following message from Twitter "After the earthquake in Izmir, our thoughts are with the victims and their relatives. Get well soon, Izmir!".
- Albania – The Albanian ambassador Kastriot Robo said "Where are with our friends in this hard time".
- Australia – The Australian ambassador to Turkey Marc Innes-Brown shared his condolences and said the following "After the earthquake in Izmir, our thoughts are with the victims and their relatives. Get well soon, Izmir!".
- Indonesia – General Chairperson of the Indonesian Red Cross and Former Vice President of Indonesia Jusuf Kalla shared his condolences and he said he was ready to send Indonesian Red Cross volunteers to Turkey to help evacuate earthquake victims if needed.
- Azerbaijan
  - The Azerbaijani President İlham Aliyev called the Turkish President Recep Tayyip Erdoğan. He said that he was sorry and they were prepared to offer aid.
  - The President of the National Parliament of Azerbaijan Sahibe Gafarova shared his condolences with his counterpart Mustafa Sentop.
- United Kingdom – The ambassador of UK Dominick Chilcott shared his condolences and said the following "The United Kingdom as always, will be in the side with Turkey".
- Denmark – The Danish ambassador Danny Annan, shared his condolences and said the following "I wish my condolences to the relatives of those who lost their lives and a speedy recovery for their benefits.".
- France – French Minister of Internal Affairs Gérald Darmanin, has said that France was ready to offer support to Greece and Turkey.
- Israel – Israeli Minister of Defense Benny Gantz said that they were ready to assist Turkey by sending a search and rescue team and a field hospital.
- Qatar
  - Embassy of Qatar said the following "Due to the Earthquake that happened in İzmir we share our condolences with the Turkish Government and to our Turkish brothers".
  - A Disaster Information Management Centre was set up in İzmir by the Qatar Red Crescent Society.
- Kazakhstan
  - The President of the Kazak Parliament Nurlan Nigmatulin, "Stating that we stand by the brotherly Turkish people and share their grief in this tragic moment, I express my urgent healing wishes to the wounded. I wish you patience and fortitude of the people of Turkey."
  - Kazakh Minister of Foreign Affairs Mukhtar Tleuberdi, sent the following message to his counterpart Mevlüt Çavuşoğlu, "I offer my deepest condolences to the bereaved families who lost their relatives by sharing irreplaceable grief. May Allah treat the deceased with His mercy. I wish urgent healing to the injured. We always pray for the well-being of the brotherly Turkish people.".
- Kosovo – Kosovo President Hashim Thaçi, shared his condolences and said the following from social media, "Our prayers are with the relatives of those who lost their lives and the injured, Kosovo stands by the Turkish people and state in this difficult time.".
- Northern Cyprus – The President of TRNC Ersin Tatar has called the Turkish President Recep Tayyip Erdoğan and shared his condolences.
- Hungary – The Hungarian ambassador Viktor Matis shared his condolences.
- Pakistan – The Pakistani Ministry of Foreign Affairs said the following, "We are always with our Turkish brothers and our prayers are with you".
- Russia
  - Russian President Vladimir Putin shared his condolences with the Turkish President Recep Tayyip Erdoğan.
  - The Russian embassy said the following "Izmir Seferihisar earthquake in Turkey thus extend our best wishes and we hope there will be no loss of life.".
- Uzbekistan – The Uzbekistani President Şevket Mirziyoyev shared his condolences.
- Ukraine – The Ukrainian President Volodymyr Zelenskyy expressed his condolences on Twitter.
- Greece – The Greek Minister of Foreign Affairs Nikos Dendias has called his counterpart Mevlüt Çavuşoğlu and shared his condolences.
- Japan – The Japanese Prime Minister Suga Yoshihide shared his condolences and said the following, "We are deeply saddened by the news that many people have died and there is serious damage, Like Turkey, Japan has experienced serious damage from earthquakes many times, and Japan and Turkey have supported each other during past earthquakes. Japan will always be with the people of Turkey in overcoming these hardships.".
- Singapore – The Minister for Foreign Affairs Vivian Balakrishnan offered his condolences to both countries, adding that the country is ready to offer assistance.

International organisations:

- European Union
  - EU Council President Charles Michel: "Developments related Strong earthquake off the coast of the Aegean Sea in Greece and Turkey are closely monitored.".
  - The EU Turkey Delegation President and Ambassador Nikolaus Meyer-Landrut heard deep sorrow for the earthquake victims "The EU expresses its deepest condolences to the families of the earthquake victims, would wish healing for a moment before the injured.".
- NATO – NATO General Secretary Jens Stoltenberg said they were ready to offer assistance.
- Turkic Council – Turkic Council General Secretary Bağdad Andreyev shared his condolences.

== Memorial ==
On the first anniversary of the event in 2021, the Çiğli municipality opened a public earthquake memorial to commemorate the event. A memorial service was held at the Hacılarkır Cemetery in the Karşıyaka where most of the victims were laid to rest. Monuments were also erected near the Rıza Bey Apartment which collapsed.

== Gallery ==
İzmir City

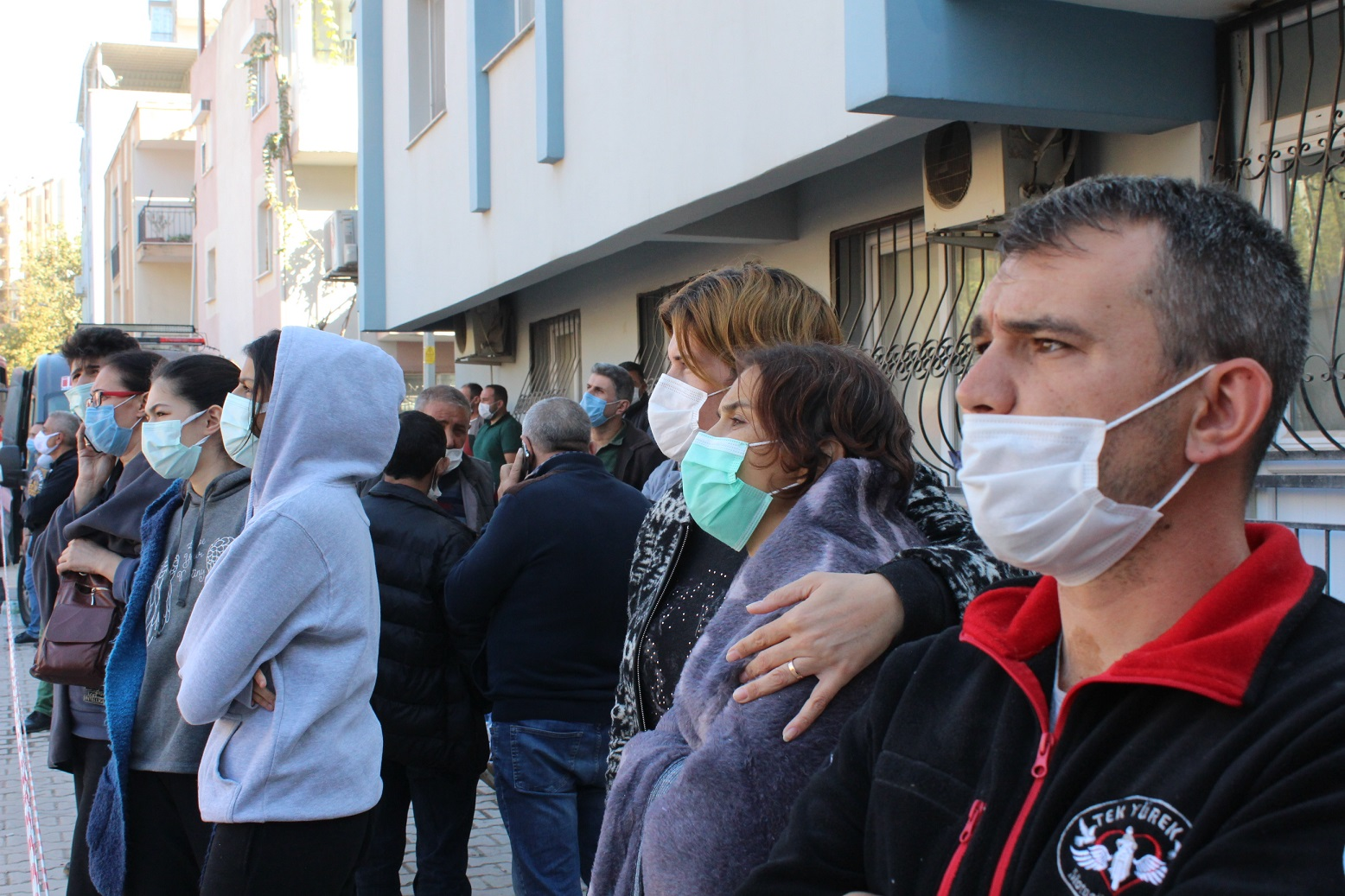
Crowds outside of their buildings.

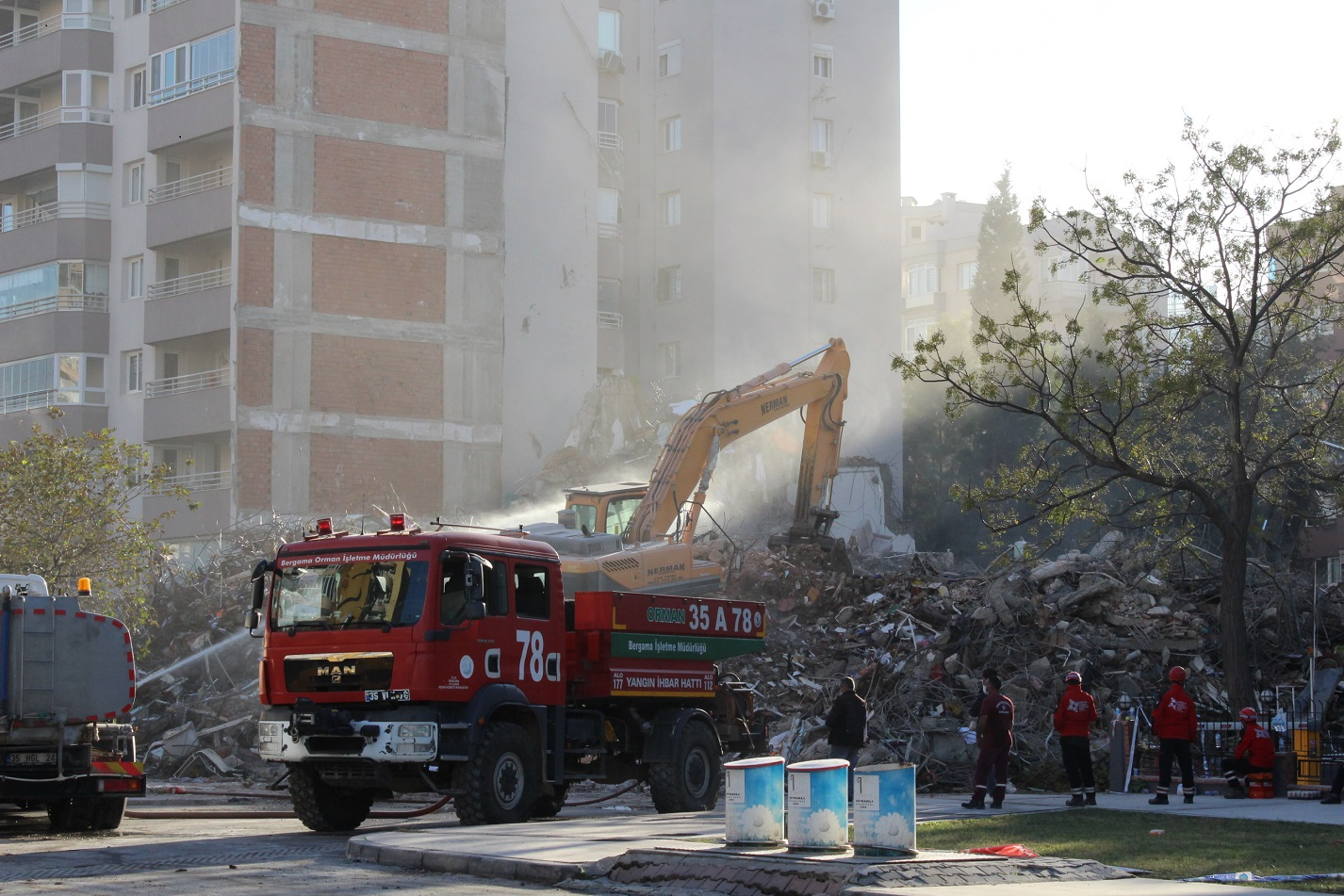
Removal of debris from the Yılmaz Erbek Apartman in November. Eleven people died.

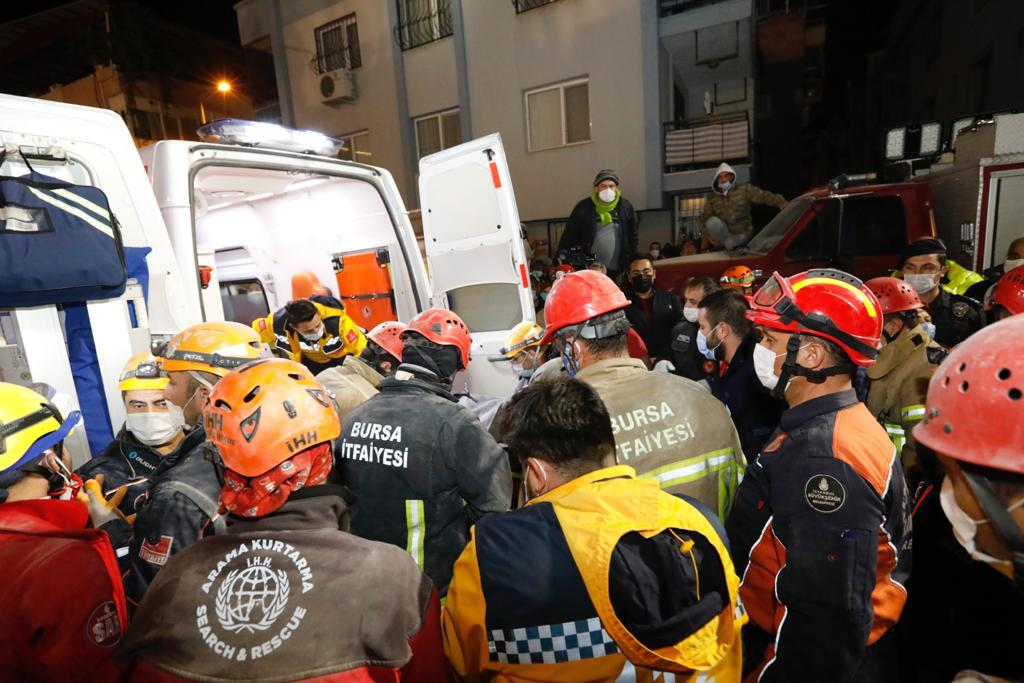
A victim transported to an ambulance.

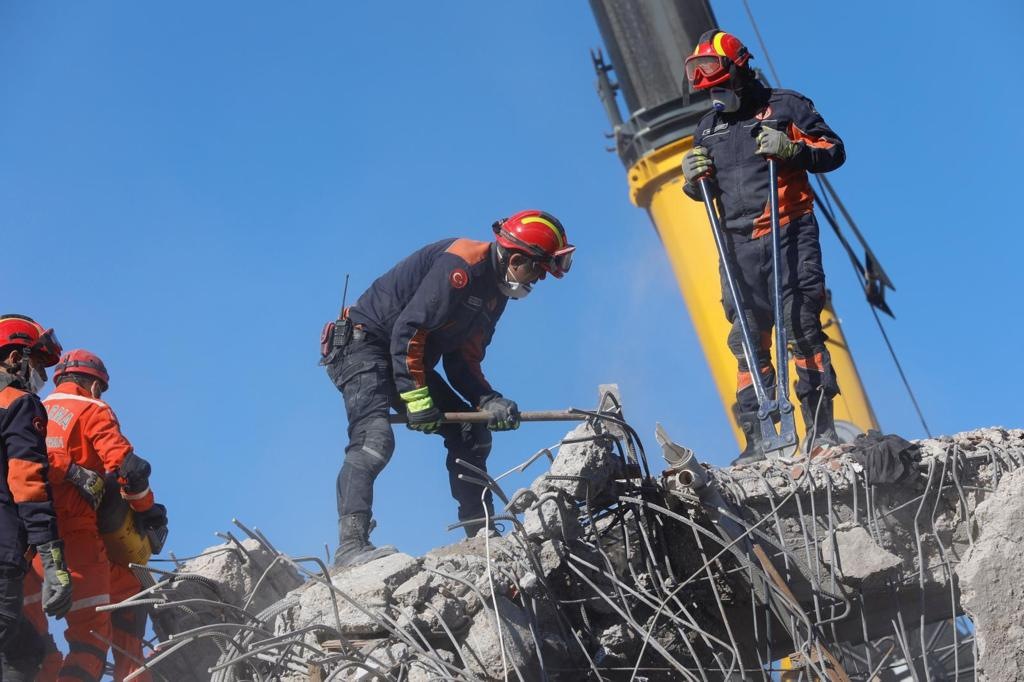
Rescue and recovery operation during the day.

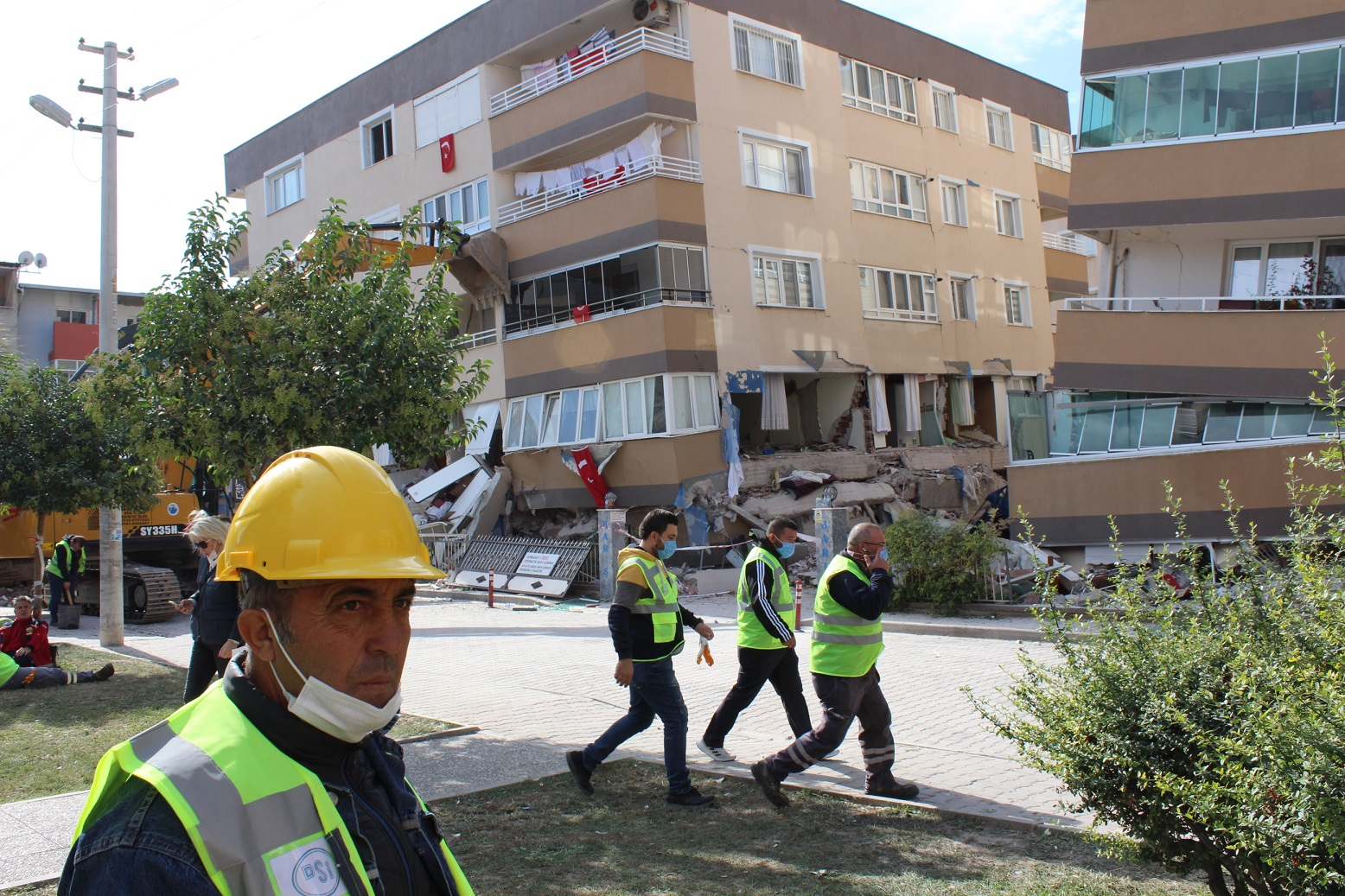
Emergency workers walk past a partially collapsed apartment.

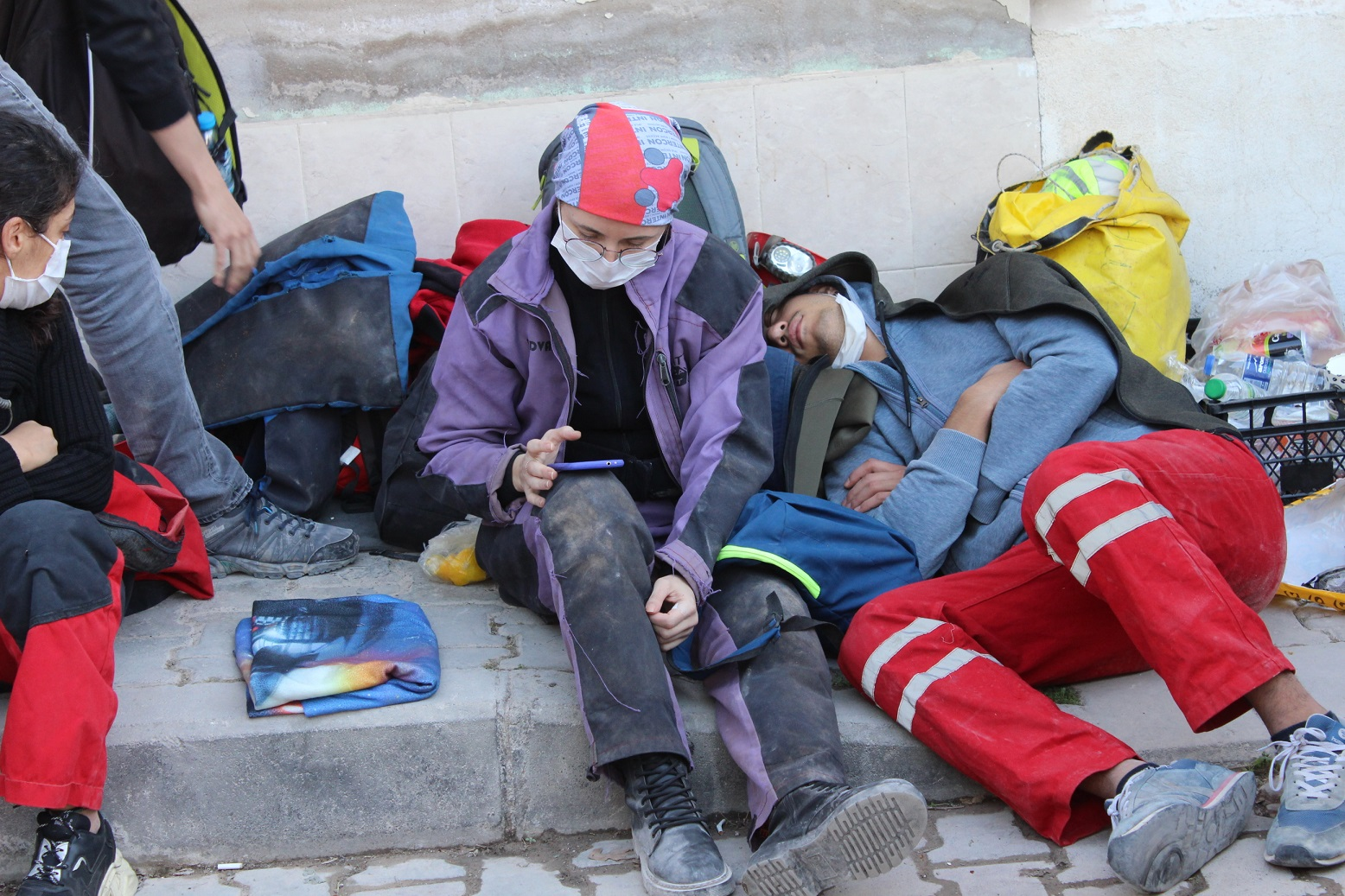
Emergency workers resting on a street.

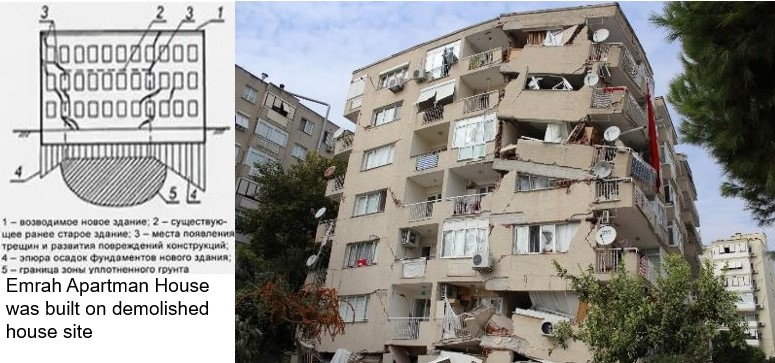
Emrah Apartment; 32 people died.

== See also ==
- 2020s in environmental history
- List of earthquakes in 2020
- List of earthquakes in Greece
- List of earthquakes in Turkey
- List of tsunamis in Europe
