= 1688 Smyrna earthquake =

Earthquake in Turkey

- Location within Turkey
- Local date: 10 July 1688
- Local time: 11:45
- Magnitude: 7.0 M_{s}
- Epicenter: 38.4°N 26.9°E
- Areas affected: Turkey
- Max. intensity: MMI X (Extreme)
- Casualties: 16,000

The 1688 Smyrna earthquake (Turkish: 1688 İzmir depremi) first occurred on 30 June. A second earthquake struck eleven days later at 11:45 on 10 July, and lasted 10 seconds according to the information provided by the British earthquake scientist Nicholas Ambraseys (1929–2012), who published the reports of the French Consulate of the period. It had an epicenter close to Smyrna, Ottoman Empire (today İzmir, Turkey). It had an estimated magnitude of 7.0 M_{s}, with a maximum felt intensity of X (Extreme) on the Mercalli intensity scale and caused about 16,000 casualties. A tsunami and a fire followed the earthquake.

== Effects ==
The Sancak Fortress, located at İnciraltı neighborhood of Balçova district in İzmir, was commissioned by Grand vizier Köprülü Mehmed Pasha in 1666, and built by Kara Mustafa Pasha in 1677 at the narrowest point of the Gulf of İzmir to control the inbound and outbound ship traffic in the gulf, collapsed to a ruin, and the canons fell in to the sea. According to the historian Sinan Meydan, the land piece, on which the fortress stood, separated from the mainland about 30 m (98 ft), and the land in Izmir collapsed 60 cm (24 in), and the ships in the port were turned upside down due to the tsunami. According to a book by Prof. Melih Tınay, 14 of the 17 mosques in Izmir were destroyed and three were seriously damaged. Three Catholic churches, and the large Greek cathedral were first collapsed. The mosques and the churches then burned. According to a letter of reader sent to the London Gazette, the fire started from the house of a Genoese citizen in the French Street four hours later, and the fire spread due to wind. Commercial inns, especially around the port, had been demolished. Approximately 700 merchants had lost their lives. Three-quarters of the city's houses were destroyed, and one-quarter were damaged beyond inhabitable. This earthquake and the fire that followed turned İzmir into a pile of rubbish and ashes, except the hilly parts of the city. The casualties were about 15,000 to 16,000 people. The most optimistic estimate is 5,000 people were dead, possibly twice that number. The city, which had become an important trade port in the Mediterranean basin in the 16th and 17th centuries, and gradually transformed into a cosmopolitan center, had a population of 55,000 in 1676 according to M.S. Kütükoğlu.

== Geology ==
The 1688 Smyrna earthquake occurred at the point, where the first fault rupture took place. The so-called "İzmir Fault", discovered after a two-year research by Prof. Hasan Sözbilir of the Dokuz Eylül University and scientists from Afyon Kocatepe University, starts from Güzelbahçe, Narlıdere, Balçova and runs north to the most populated areas of İzmir. It is likely that the plain between Maount Çatalkaya in Narlıdere and the Gulf of İzmir, including İnciraltı, has soft ground. Such loose soils liquefy and give a liquid response when they encounter violent shaking. They cannot carry any load, and some of the structures on them sink into the ground as if they were submerged in water.

== Aftermath ==
When the city was rebuilt, houses were mainly built of wood, apart from the foundations and the base of the walls where stone was used. This made the reconstructed buildings more resistant to future earthquakes.

== See also ==
- List of earthquakes in Turkey
- List of historical earthquakes
- 2020 Aegean Sea earthquake
