= 1904 Samos earthquake =

Earthquake in Samos, Greece

- Location within Greece
- UTC time: 1904-08-11 06:06:57
- ISC event: n/a
- USGS-ANSS: ComCat
- Local date: August 11, 1904
- Local time: 07:56
- Magnitude: 6.1–6.8 M_{w}
- Depth: 15 km (9 mi)
- Epicenter: 37.75°N 27.00°E
- Type: Oblique-slip
- Areas affected: Greece
- Max. intensity: MMI X (Extreme)
- Casualties: 4 deaths

The 1904 Samos earthquake struck Greece on August 11 with moment magnitude of 6.1−6.8 and a maximum Mercalli intensity of X (Extreme). Four people were killed.

== Damage and casualties ==
The earthquake registered a magnitude of 6.1–6.8 on the moment magnitude scale. Between the main shock and an aftershock that followed three days later, 540 houses were destroyed on Samos, then an autonomous part of the Ottoman Empire. Four people were killed. Damage extended to Patmos and Anatolia, while shaking from the earthquake reached from offshore Chios and Santorini to Ödemiş and Aydın in Turkey.

== Geology ==
Along its source fault, the earthquake created 46 km (29 mi) of ruptured rock and had an average displacement of 1.2 m (3 ft 11 in). It originated from oblique-slip faulting. The island of Samos disconnected from Anatolia, and the strait between them is less than 15 km (9.3 mi) in width. The island itself is a horst, and a large fault runs along the island's NW-W coast. Tectonic uplift is noticeable at the shores of Samos, likely linked to historic earthquakes.

== Seismic history ==
Within the last two centuries, Samos has experienced multiple powerful earthquakes registering above magnitude 6.0. Six such earthquakes were recorded during the 19th century and two more in the 20th. Analysis indicates three earthquakes before the 19th century in circa 200 BC, 47, and 1761. An earthquake in 1476 may have devastated the island to the extent that its occupants, the Genovese, evacuated. Uplift from the 6th century implies another earthquake circa 500.

== See also ==
- List of earthquakes in 1904
- List of earthquakes in Greece
- 2020 Aegean Sea earthquake
