= Sığacık =

- Neighbourhood
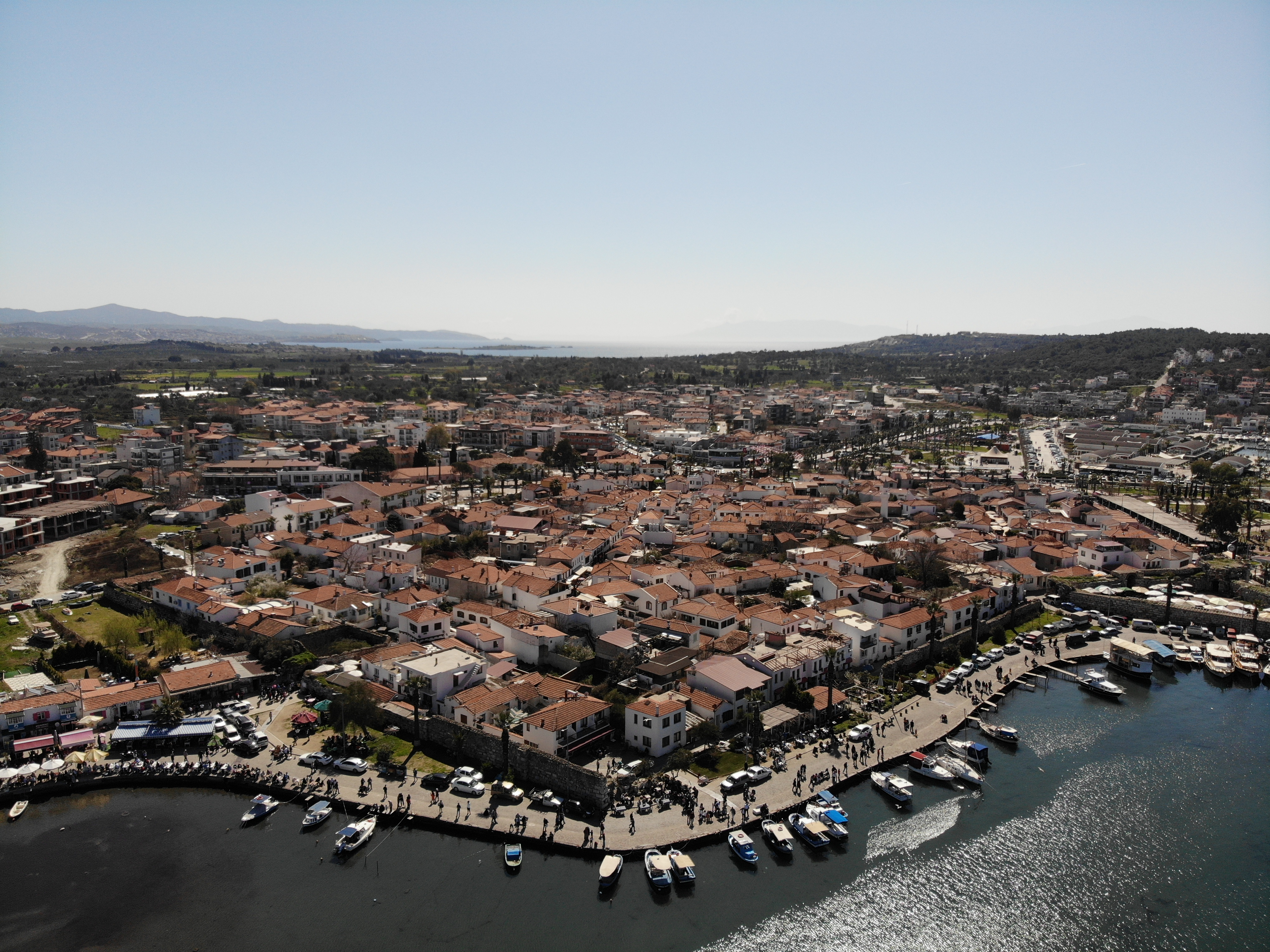
- Aerial view of Sığacık

- Location within Turkey Location within İzmir
- Coordinates: 38°11′N 26°47′E
- Country: Turkey
- Province: İzmir
- District: Seferihisar
- Population (2022): 3,913
- Time zone: UTC+3 (TRT)
- Area code: 0232

Sığacık is a neighbourhood in the municipality and district of Seferihisar, İzmir Province, Turkey. Its population is 3,913 (2022). Its distance to Seferihisar centre is less than 5 kilometres (3.1 mi). It is situated on a small peninsula, facing north. The harbor is in the east side of and the beaches are in the west side.

Sığacık is home to the ancient city of Teos with a history dating back to 1000 BC, boasts a strong cultural heritage extending from antiquity to the present day. The Temple of Dionysos and Sığacık Castle, dating from the Ottoman period, offer visitors a living historical experience. The guesthouses operating within the castle walls provide guests with the opportunity to stay amidst the historical fabric, while also contributing to the preservation of cultural continuity.

An Ottoman castle built in 1522 is also in Sığacık.

Up to 2009 Sığacık was a fishermen's village. In 2009 Sığacık became one of the first towns in Turkey to join the Cittaslow movement, focussing on slower and healthier lifestyles, environmental conservation and local production.

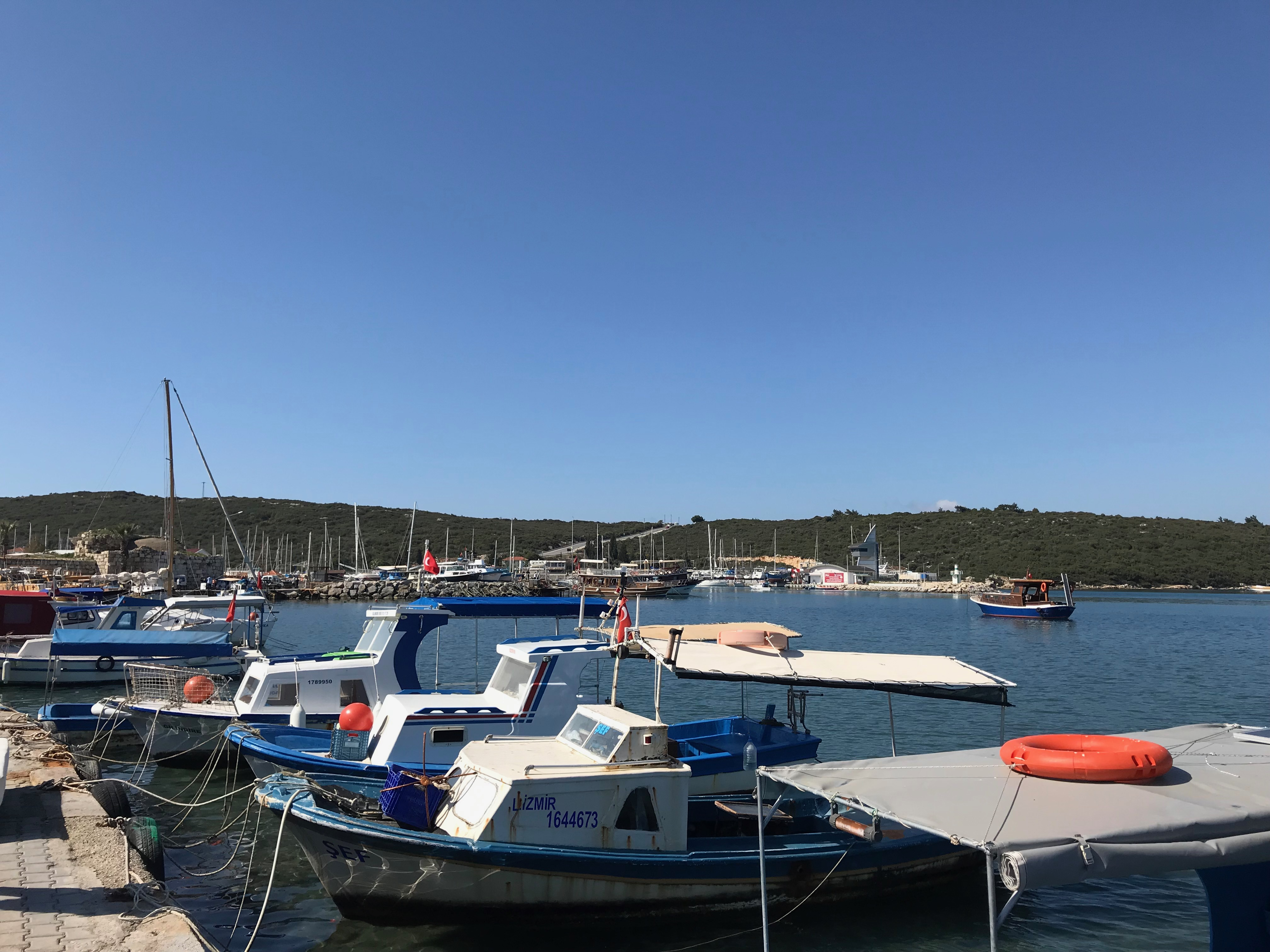
Sığacık Bay

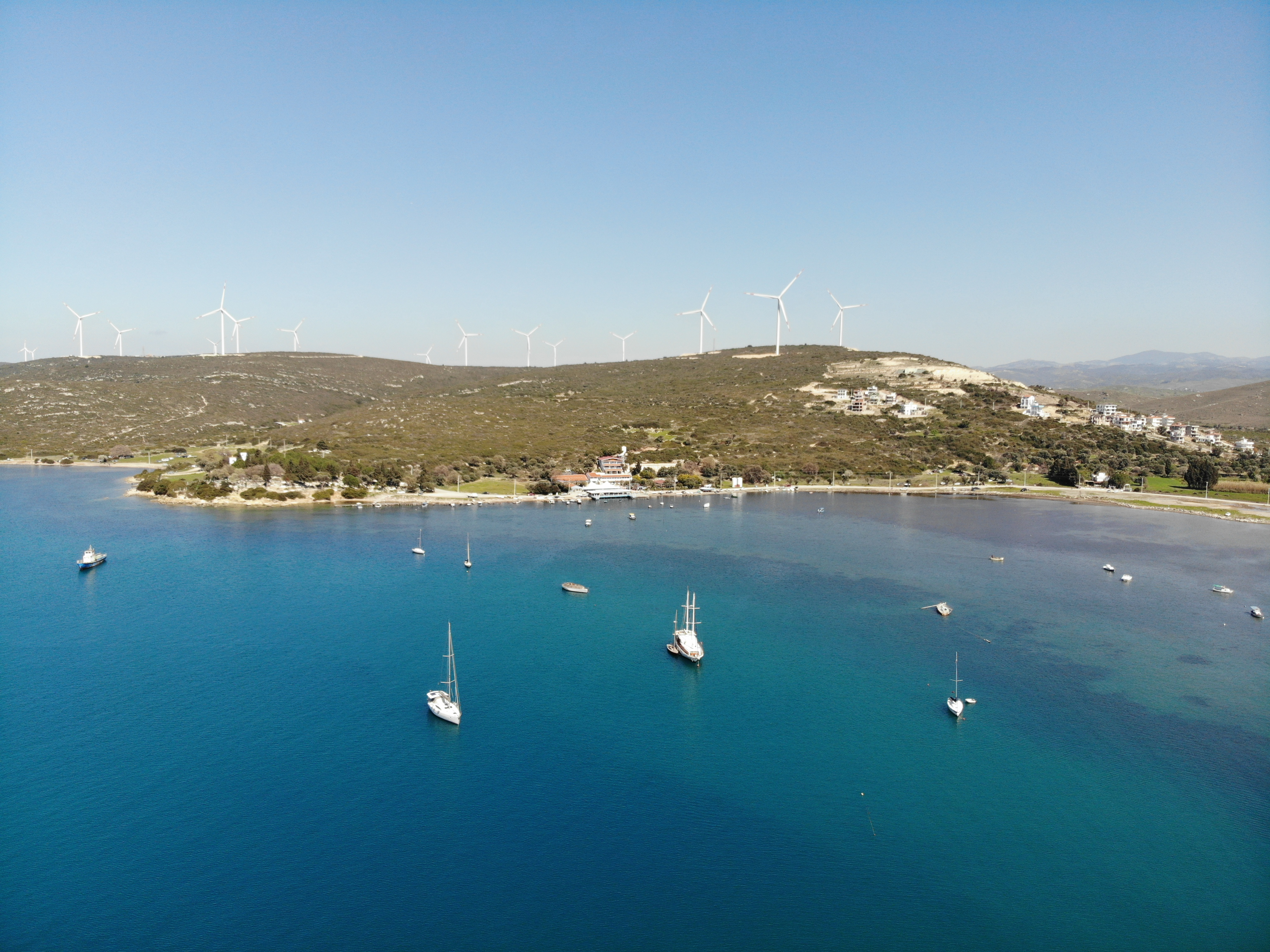
Aerial view of the Sığacık Bay

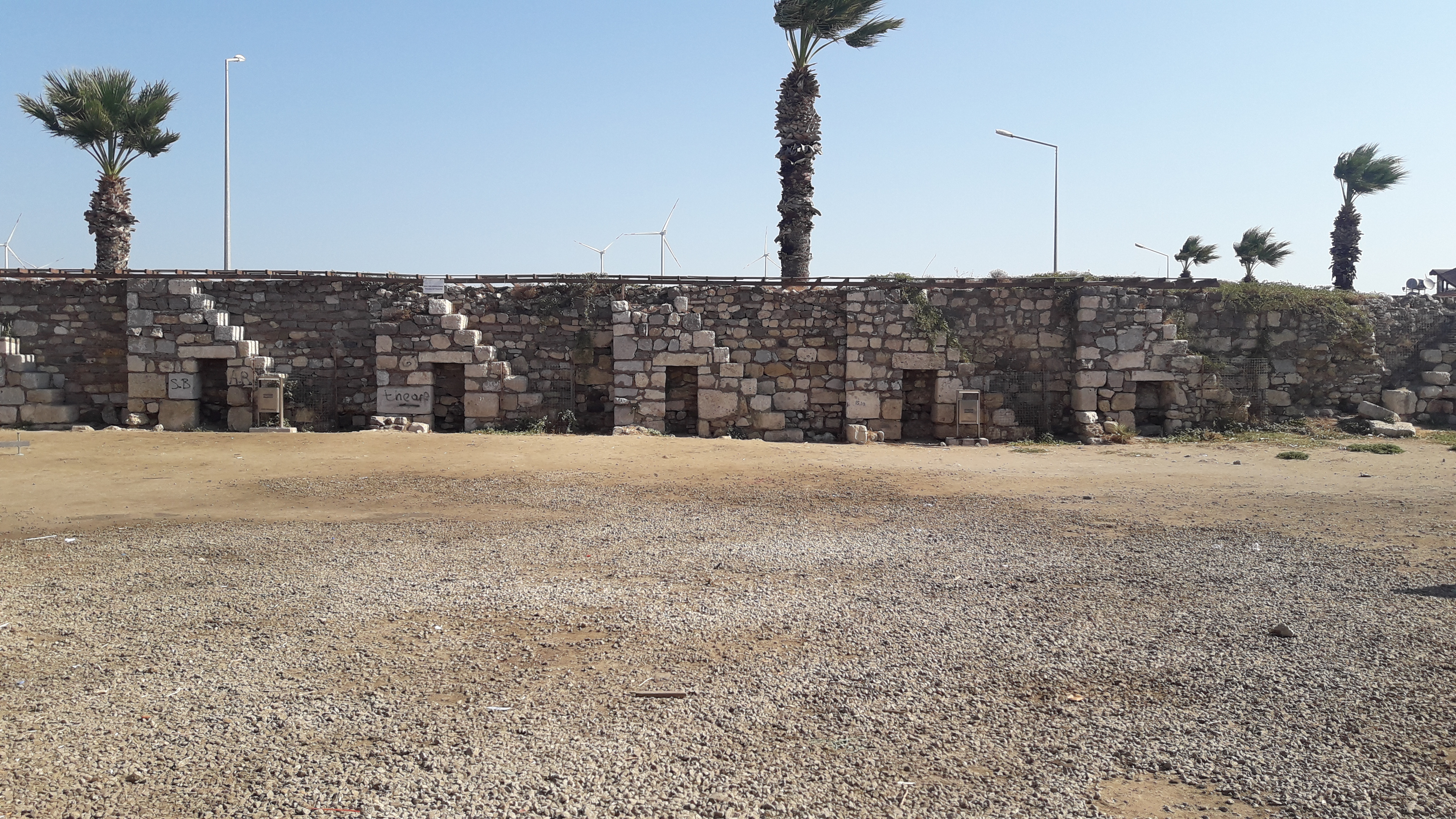
Walls of the Ottoman Castle

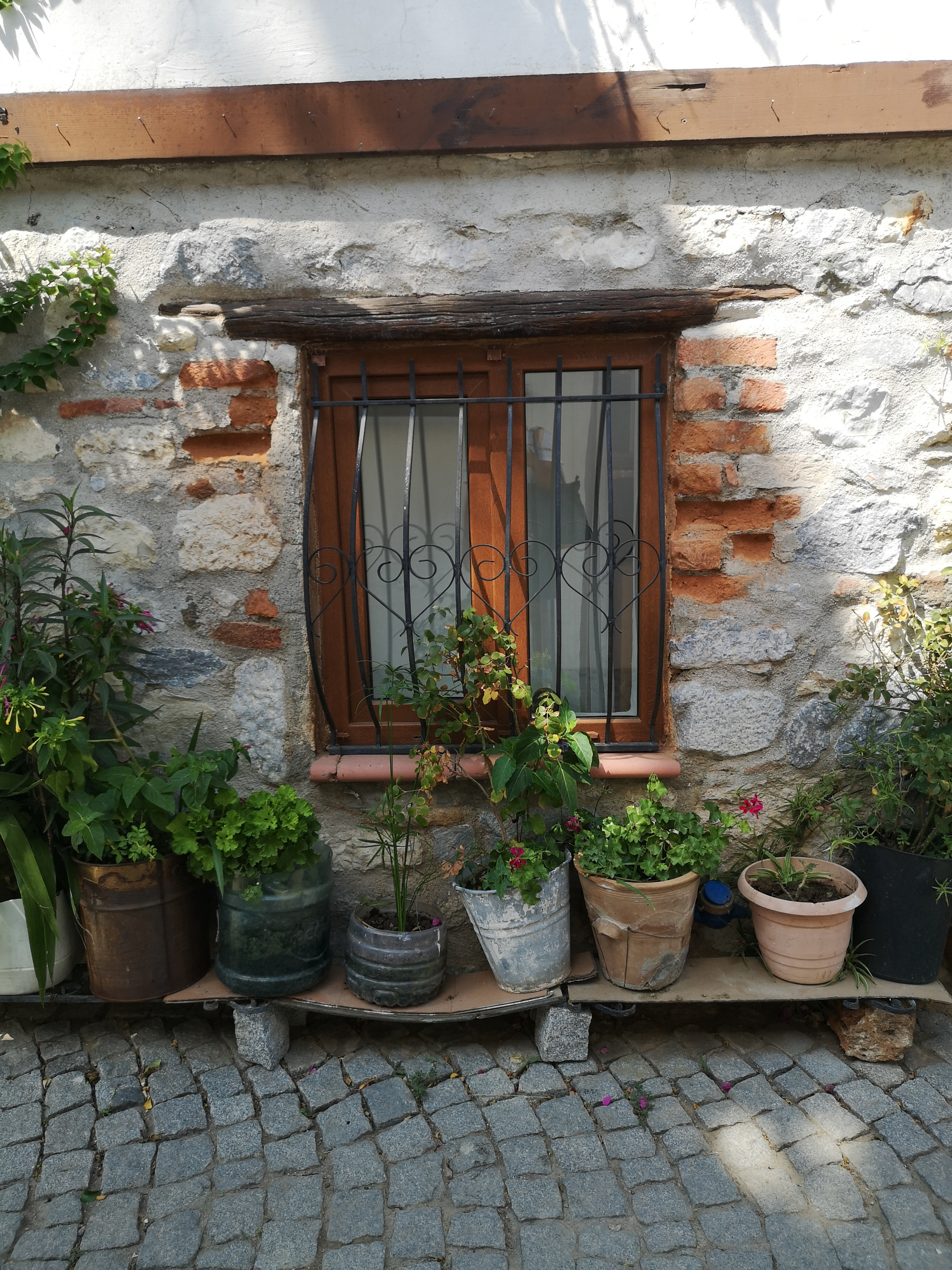
