= Krupnik, Blagoevgrad Province =

Krupnik, Blagoevgrad Province Крупник
- Village
- Location within Bulgaria
- Coordinates: 41°51′N 23°7′E
- Country: Bulgaria
- Province: Blagoevgrad Province
- Municipality: Simitli Municipality

Government
  - Mayor: Apostol Apostolov

Area
  - Total: 35.412 km^{2} (13.673 sq mi)
- Elevation: 370 m (1,210 ft)

Population (2024)
  - Total: 2,004
  - Density: 56.59/km^{2} (146.6/sq mi)
- Time zone: UTC+2 (EET)
  - Summer (DST): UTC+3 (EEST)
- Post code: 2740
- Area code: (+359) 9748
- Vehicle registration: E

Krupnik (Крупник) is a village in Simitli Municipality, in Blagoevgrad Province, in southwestern Bulgaria in the Kresna Gorge. It is located in the western part of Maleshevskata mountain.

== Population ==
Historical population

Year	Pop.	±%
1934	1,702	—
1946	2,246	+32.0%
1956	1,803	−19.7%
1965	2,030	+12.6%
1975	2,213	+9.0%

Year	Pop.	±%
1985	2,445	+10.5%
1992	2,466	+0.9%
2001	2,392	−3.0%
2011	2,078	−13.1%
2024	2,004	−3.6%

== Events ==
On January 1st, the village celebrates "Surva", with puppeteers going around and dancing for health and fertility.

== Notable people ==
- Martin Toshev (born 1990 in Krupnik), professional footballer
