= Myonessus =

Ancient Ionian town

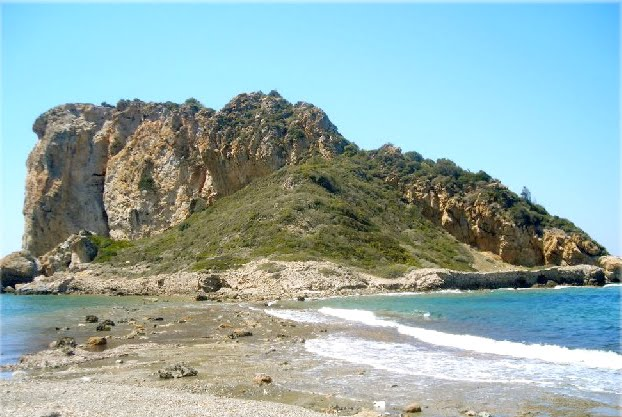
Island of Myonnesos

Myonessus or Myonessos (Ancient Greek: Μυόννησος) was a town of ancient Ionia, located near Teos and Lebedus. It was situated on promontory of the same name. An island also called Myonessus stood offshore. The location is noted for the naval battle offshore in 190 BCE between the Romans and Antiochus the Great.

Although the site of the island is known (modern Cıfıtkalesi Islet); the site of the ancient town is unlocated.
