= Seferihisar =

- District and municipality
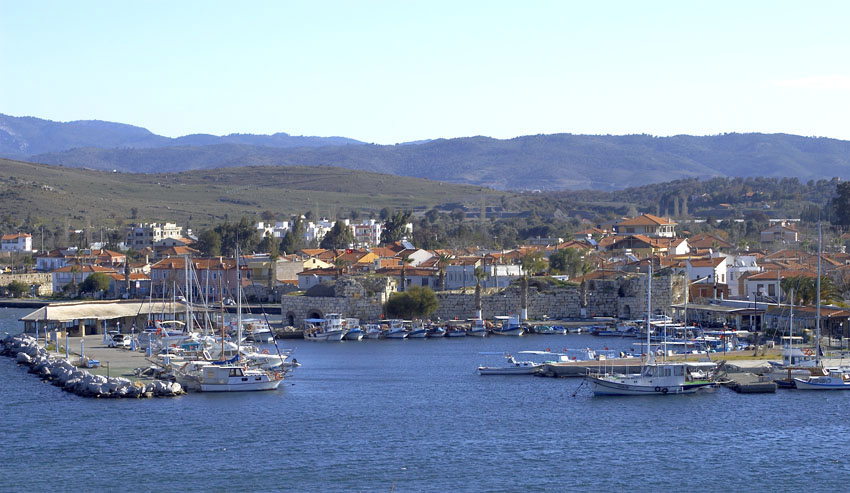
- Marina and medieval castle in Seferihisar's Sığacık coastal area

- Map showing Seferihisar District in İzmir Province

- Location within Turkey Location within İzmir
- Coordinates: 38°12′N 26°50′E
- Country: Turkey
- Province: İzmir

Government
  - Mayor: İsmail Yetişkin (CHP)
- Area: 375 km^{2} (145 sq mi)
- Population (2024): 60,914
  - Density: 162/km^{2} (421/sq mi)
- Time zone: UTC+3 (TRT)
- Area code: 0232
- Website: www.seferihisar.bel.tr

Seferihisar is a municipality and district of İzmir Province, Turkey. Its area is 375 km^{2}, and its population is 60,914 (2024). Seferihisar district area borders on other İzmir districts of Urla to the west and Menderes to the east, and touches İzmir's westernmost metropolitan district of Güzelbahçe in the north. Seferihisar town center is situated slightly inland at an altitude of 28 m and the urban area extends towards the Aegean Sea. The neighborhood Sığacık has its own port and made a name as a tourism resort. The wide area of the district center partly accounts for the high number of the population and an urbanization rate of only 51%, and the general impression observed is rather rural in some of its sections. Both the center town and the district as a whole preserves an overall outlook of a pleasant resort area bearing typical Aegean characteristics and it is estimated the population reaches the level of 150,000 people during the touristic season. Nevertheless, the district's economy is still largely based on agriculture, with the production of tangerines and satsumas standing out, and only increasingly on tourism, with the presence of several housing projects or vacation villages, pensioners opting to settle in the region due to its quiet charm and under the impetus of a university campus that is in phase of being built. At a distance of 45 km (28 mi) from İzmir center, (Konak), the connections with the metropolis are made easily, especially once reached the six-lane highway in Urla. Seferihisar is where the ancient city of Teos is located and its highly interesting await further research and discoveries. The district's literacy level is 99%.

== History ==
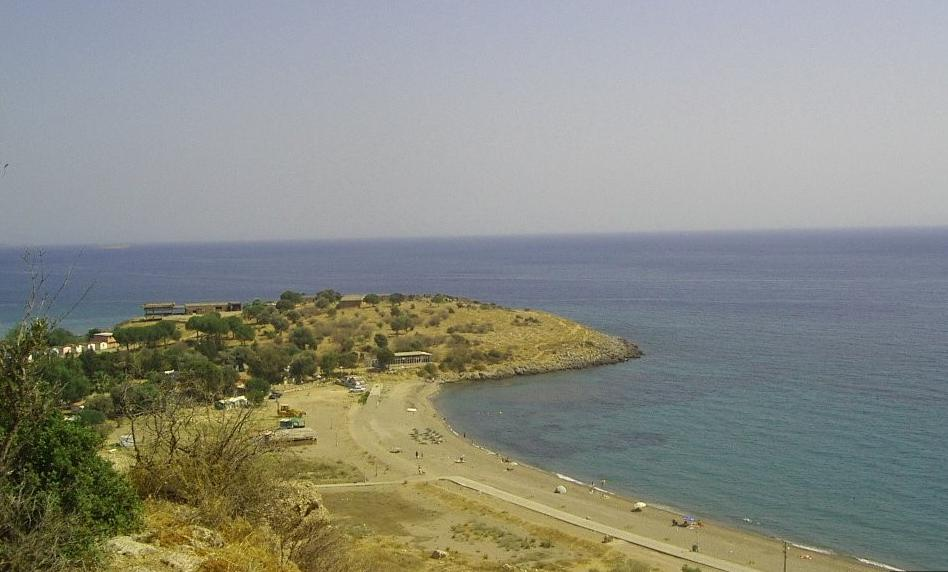
Kısık Peninsula or Lebedos Peninsula to the south of Seferihisar at Mersinalanı (Ürkmez)

Apart from Teos, a major Ionian port and artistic and cult center, two other ancient settlements datable to the ancient Greek period and beyond are located along Seferihisar district's seashore, both to the south of Teos. Near the southern boundary of the district is Lebedos, the smallest of the twelve original Ionian settlements along the Anatolian coastline. Pausanias mentions that the town was initially inhabited by Carians, for whom the region is normally a very northern one, and that Ionian Greeks immigrated there under the guidance of Andræmon, while Strabo gives the name the colonizing leader as Andropompus and that it previously bore the name of Artis of ancient Lydia. Although it is known to have engaged in maritime commerce, was famous for its mineral springs and a member of the Ionian League, the peninsular settlement of Lebedos suffered from the limited space of its hinterland and a comparatively unsuitable port. It has not been excavated and the visible ruins are scanty.

The other settlement, at the edge of a promontory between Teos and Lebedos, referred to by Hecataeus of Miletus (500 BC) as a "city" and by Artemidorus of Ephesus (100 BC) as merely a "place" is Myonnesos. The best definition for ancient times must have corresponded to that of a small town, advantaged by a peninsula with a 60 m cliff which was very difficult to access and easy to defend. Traces of Cyclopeian walls attest to the presence of a very particular site and it remains a visitor's attraction due to the challenges of rock climbing it offers.

Ottoman records refer to the present-day center town alternatively as "Seferihisar" or "Sivrihisar", sometimes leading to confusion with another town in Central Anatolia still named Sivrihisar, and which itself was nevertheless recorded from time to time as "Seferihisar". While the historic medrese in the depending village of Hereke (Düzce today) remained a regional center of learning throughout, on many occasions during the Ottoman period, the region of Seferihisar had made itself notorious as a pirate's lair, being a particularly appreciated hideout and at times a practically autonomous entity. The town is notably the birthplace of two of the best known Turkish corsairs of the very end of the 15th century, Kara Hasan and Kara Turmuş

The region was, as such, scarcely populated and development came gradually only in the course of the 19th century, due especially to cultivation of citrus fruits and cash crops. From 1867 until 1922, Seferihisar was part of Aidin Vilayet. The municipal administration was instituted in 1884 and by the time of the fall of the Empire, the kaza of Seferihisar counted 10,475 people, in which 2.641, about a quarter were Greeks, mostly recent immigrants from the islands or other areas of Anatolia, while 7.816 were Turks

== Settlement and geography ==
Seferihisar district is one of the smaller districts of İzmir Province by population and the inward immigration level is rather low at only 0.18% despite rising interest in recent years by pensioners, those seeking secondary summer residences and university academia. The real estate market thus remains underexploited in striking contrast with the districts of Urla and Çeşme neighboring Seferihisar to the west. Several projected housing projects and the move by Yaşar University to its campus in phase of being built in the town are expected to change the present trend of stagnation.

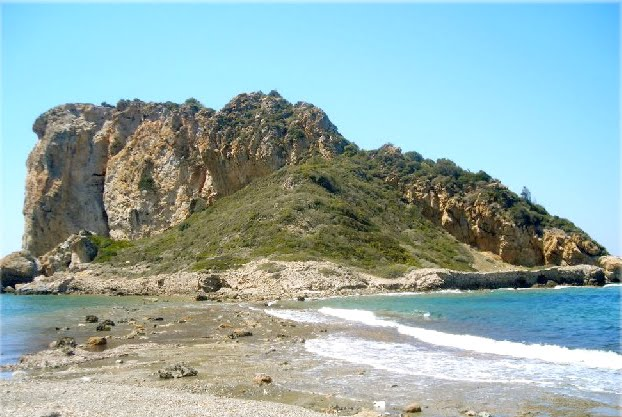
Çıfıt Island/Myonnesos is a prized location for rock climbers.

Çakmaktepe is the highest point of the district with 680 m. Two streams, Kocaçay Stream and Hereke Stream cross the district area to join the sea within its boundaries and these generally dry up in summer. Five small dams are built on these streams and their affluents for agricultural irrigation purposes and there are also two artificial lakes built for the same objective. Four small islands depend Seferihisar district and a fifth near Doğanbey locality, connected to the mainland by a small causeway but still called Çıfıtkalesi Islet (ancient "Myonnesos", still also often called as such locally) is a prized location for rock climbers.

=== Climate ===
Seferihisar has a hot-summer Mediterranean climate (Köppen: Csa), with hot, dry summers, and cool, rainy winters.

Climate data for Seferihisar (1991–2020)
Month	Jan	Feb	Mar	Apr	May	Jun	Jul	Aug	Sep	Oct	Nov	Dec	Year
Mean daily maximum °C (°F)	13.0 (55.4)	14.0 (57.2)	16.6 (61.9)	20.4 (68.7)	25.4 (77.7)	30.7 (87.3)	33.6 (92.5)	33.6 (92.5)	29.3 (84.7)	24.3 (75.7)	18.9 (66.0)	14.5 (58.1)	22.9 (73.2)
Daily mean °C (°F)	8.7 (47.7)	9.5 (49.1)	11.6 (52.9)	15.0 (59.0)	19.7 (67.5)	24.7 (76.5)	27.4 (81.3)	27.4 (81.3)	23.2 (73.8)	18.6 (65.5)	13.8 (56.8)	10.2 (50.4)	17.5 (63.5)
Mean daily minimum °C (°F)	4.8 (40.6)	5.4 (41.7)	7.1 (44.8)	9.9 (49.8)	14.1 (57.4)	18.7 (65.7)	21.6 (70.9)	21.8 (71.2)	17.7 (63.9)	13.7 (56.7)	9.4 (48.9)	6.5 (43.7)	12.6 (54.7)
Average precipitation mm (inches)	125.29 (4.93)	96.71 (3.81)	71.05 (2.80)	43.19 (1.70)	22.49 (0.89)	6.42 (0.25)	0.21 (0.01)	0.85 (0.03)	15.94 (0.63)	52.39 (2.06)	86.45 (3.40)	124.14 (4.89)	645.13 (25.40)
Average precipitation days (≥ 1.0 mm)	8.8	8.4	6.2	4.9	3.1	2.0	1.0	1.0	1.9	3.7	6.7	8.9	56.6
Average relative humidity (%)	72.1	70.8	68.8	66.5	63.2	56.9	53.9	56.2	61.1	68.1	71.9	73.7	65.3
Source: NOAA

== Composition ==
There are 22 neighbourhoods in Seferihisar District:

- Akarca
- Atatürk
- Bengiler
- Beyler
- Camikebir
- Çamtepe
- Çolak Ibrahim Bey
- Cumhuriyet
- Düzce
- Gödence
- Gölcük
- Hıdırlık
- İhsaniye
- Kavakdere
- Mersinalanı
- Orhanlı
- Payamlı
- Sığacık
- Tepecik
- Turabiye
- Turgut
- Ulamış

== Economy ==
Since citrus fruits occupy a considerable share in Seferihisar's agricultural production, the district's economy is relatively outward, including international, oriented, and Seferihisar realized exports nearing 10 million US Dollars in 2006. Other notable agricultural products include olives and vegetables, with viniculture and production of flowers grown under greenhouse conditions becoming increasingly important in recent years.

Tourism's growing importance is attested by the increase to a total bed capacity of 4,539 for the district as a whole in recent years. Only ten of the district's 1381 enterprises are registered as pursuing industrial activities, with nearly a thousand active in small-scale crafts and trades. Nine companies are registered exporters. There are 12 companies with foreign capital operating in Seferihisar district and among these one, corresponding to a capital of about 5 million US Dollars, was constituted in the last decade. There are four banks providing services through four branches in Seferihisar.

The total number of residences in Seferihisar district is 12,146, the part occupied by secondary residences owned by seasonal inhabitants starting to correspond to a significant share in this number. The literacy rate nears hundred per cent and the number of students per teacher is quite comfortable at 16. As a basic indicator of health services, there is one doctor for 1,495 patients. The yearly income level per inhabitant was calculated at 2,693 US Dollars in 2007, well below the national and provincial average.

== Sights of interest ==
The district's most popular sights of interest is its depending small port of Sığacık with the Genoese - Ottomans. In 2008 that small port was redesigned by Turkish architect Günay Erdem and Turkish landscape architect Sunay Erdem. At 2010 construction of this new port ended and revealed its current state as Teos Marina. The ancient city of Teos is located between Seferihisar and Sığacık.

There is also the rock of Myonnesos and the ruins locally called "Karaköse", both near Doğanbey township. The other ancient city found within the district, Lebedos, is located further south, near Mersinalanı township.

A French vacation village is located near Sığacık. Seferihisar district also has several beaches and bays along its 27 km coastline.

== See also ==
- December 2007 Seferihisar, Turkey migrant boat disaster
- 2020 Aegean Sea earthquake
- Efes exercise

== Sources ==
- George E. Bean. Aegean Turkey: An archaeological guide, p. 115-122 ISBN 978-0-510-03200-5, 1967. Ernest Benn, London.
