= Lebedus =

Ancient city in western Anatolia

- Λέβεδος (Ancient Greek)
- Lebedos
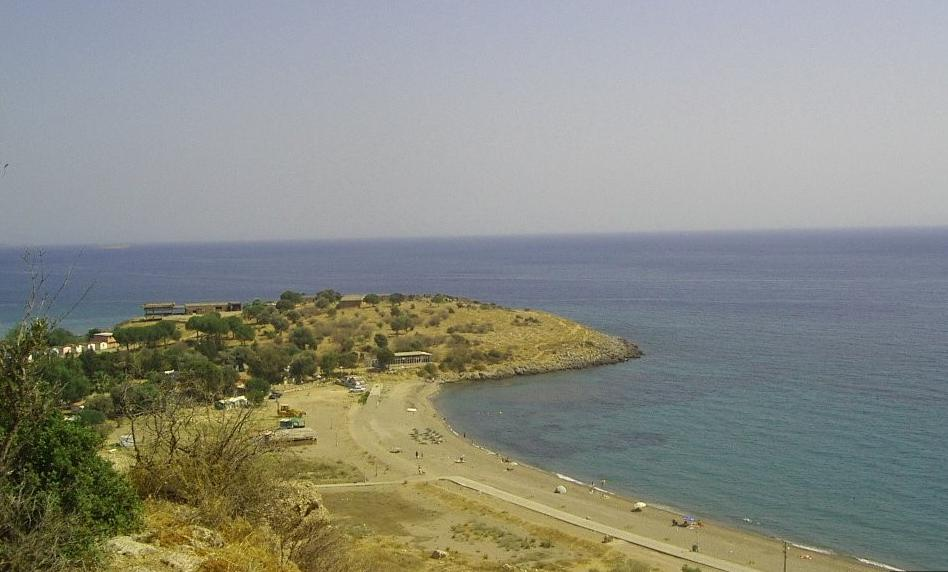
- Lebedos was located on and around the Kısık Peninsula.

- Location within Turkey
- 38°4′41″N 26°57′53″E
- Type: Settlement
- Location: Ürkmez, İzmir Province, Turkey
- Region: Ionia

Lebedus or Lebedos (Ancient Greek: Λέβεδος) was one of the twelve cities of the Ionian League, located south of Smyrna, Klazomenai and neighboring Teos and before Ephesus, which is further south. It was on the coast, ninety stadia (16.65 km) to the east of Cape Myonnesus, and 120 (22.2 km) west of Colophon.

The city was built on and around a very small peninsula (175 m long, reaching a height of 61 m and with an isthmus 201 m wide), which is called the Kısık Peninsula today and depends on the coastal township of Ürkmez, part of Seferihisar locality, a district center depending on the province seat of İzmir.

== History ==
=== Iron Age ===
According to Pausanias, the town was inhabited by Carians when the Ionian Greeks immigrated there under the guidance of Andræmon, a son of Codrus. Strabo, however, states that it was colonized by Andropompus (Ancient Greek: Ἀνδρόπομπος) and that it previously bore the name of Artis in Lydia. Velleius Paterculus wrote that Greeks from Athens established the city as well as other cities in Ionia. Lebedos became a flourishing city thanks to its commerce, and was famous for its mineral springs, but it was one of the smaller cities of the Ionian League, handicapped by the limited space of its hinterland and a comparatively unsuitable port.

=== Classical Age ===
In the Hellenistic period, around 304 BC, Antigonus I Monophthalmus tried to join the city with Teos; however, this operation was incomplete and eventually annulled by Lysimachus, who moved its population to Ephesus in 292 BC. At some point, the name Ptolemais (Πτολεμαΐς) was bestowed on the town, probably by Ptolemy III Euergetes.

The poet Horace in one of his Epistles (1.11.7–8) describes it as very quiet: 'a small town more deserted than Gabii or Fidenae'. He imagines his friend Bullatius contemplating a life of retirement there.

Lebedus was the meeting place and settlement of the Dionysiac artists of Ionia as far as the Hellespont. Every year, games and a general festival were held there in honour of Dionysus. The artists had previously lived in Teos but left following civil unrest. After moving to Ephesus and Myonnesus, they eventually settled in Lebedus, whose inhabitants welcomed them.

Its scanty remains are near the modern town of Seferihisar. Pieces of attic black-glazed pottery were uncovered in the area during an archeological survey carried out by Kütahya Dumlupınar University in Turkey between 2017 and 2019.

== Ecclesiastical history ==
Lebedus was an episcopal see, suffragan of Ephesus until the 12th or 13th century. Three bishops are known: Cyriacus, who witnessed the Second Council of Ephesus in 449; Julian, represented by his metropolitan at the Council of Chalcedon in 451; Theophanes or Thomas, who attended the Second Council of Nicaea in 787.

Lebedus remains as a Roman Catholic titular see.

== Sources ==
- Bean, George E. (1967). Aegean Turkey: An archaeological guide. London: Ernest Benn. pp. 115-122. ISBN 978-0-510-03200-5.
