= List of municipalities in İzmir Province =

This is the List of municipalities in İzmir Province, Turkey as of October 2007.

== Municipalities ==
List is sorted alphabetically A-Z, as Districts->Municipalities.

District	Municipality
Aliağa	Aliağa
Aliağa	Helvacı
Aliağa	Yenişakran
Balçova	Balçova
Bayındır	Bayındır
Bayındır	Canlı
Bayındır	Çırpı
Bayındır	Zeytinova
Bergama	Ayaskent
Bergama	Bergama
Bergama	Bölcek
Bergama	Göçbeyli
Bergama	Yenikent
Bergama	Zeytindağ
Beydağ	Beydağ
Bornova	Bornova
Buca	Buca
Buca	Kaynaklar
Çeşme	Alaçatı
Çeşme	Çeşme
Çiğli	Çiğli
Çiğli	Sasallı
Dikili	Çandarlı
Dikili	Dikili
Foça	Bağarası
Foça	Foça
Foça	Gerenköy
Foça	Yenifoça
Gaziemir	Gaziemir
Gaziemir	Sarnıç
Güzelbahçe	Güzelbahçe
Güzelbahçe	Yelki
Karaburun	Karaburun
Karaburun	Mordoğan
Karşıyaka	Karşıyaka
Kemalpaşa	Armutlu
Kemalpaşa	Bağyurdu
Kemalpaşa	Kemalpaşa
Kemalpaşa	Ören
Kemalpaşa	Ulucak
Kemalpaşa	Yukarıkızılca
Kınık	Kınık
Kınık	Poyracık
Kınık	Yayakent
Kiraz	Kiraz
Konak	Konak
Menderes	Değirmendere
Menderes	Görece
Menderes	Gümüldür
Menderes	Menderes
Menderes	Oğlananası
Menderes	Özdere
Menderes	Tekeli
Menemen	Asarlık
Menemen	Emiralem
Menemen	Harmandalı
Menemen	Koyundere
Menemen	Maltepe
Menemen	Menemen
Menemen	Seyrek
Menemen	Türkelli
Menemen	Ulukent
Narlıdere	Narlıdere
Ödemiş	Bademli
Ödemiş	Birgi
Ödemiş	Bozdağ
Ödemiş	Çaylı
Ödemiş	Gölcük
Ödemiş	Kayaköy
Ödemiş	Kaymakçı
Ödemiş	Konaklı
Ödemiş	Ödemiş
Ödemiş	Ovakent
Seferihisar	Doğanbey
Seferihisar	Seferihisar
Seferihisar	Ürkmez
Selçuk	Belevi
Selçuk	Selçuk
Tire	Gökçen
Tire	Tire
Torbalı	Ayrancılar
Torbalı	Çaybaşı
Torbalı	Karakuyu
Torbalı	Pancar
Torbalı	Subaşı
Torbalı	Torbalı
Torbalı	Yazıbaşı
Urla	Urla

== Changes in 2014 ==
According to Law act no 6360, belde (town) municipalities within provinces with more than 750000 population (so called Metropolitan municipalities in Turkey) were abolished as of 30 March 2014. 23 belde municipalities in the above list are now defunct. The list is kept for historical reference.
