= Dideiphyta =

Town of ancient Lydia

Coordinates: 38°05′48″N 27°47′19″E

Dideiphyta was a town of ancient Lydia, inhabited during Roman and Byzantine times. Its site is located near Kireli in Asiatic Turkey.

In the early 310s CE, a Roman governor ordered a detailed census of each household of Lydia, including the village of Dideipyta, in "the territory of Hypaipa." Bizarrely, the unnamed governor had the census records inscribed in stone; this act preserved the best records of households in Roman Anatolia that survived into the 21st century. They include a man whose name is lost to history living with his widowed mother and young sister; a single man named Aurelius Synodios, 20; Aur. Hermalaos, 50, 2 children, and a woman and foster child; Aur. Dionysios and his wife and child; Aur. Eutyches and his wife and older son; and Aur. Kalachritios, his wife, 2 children, and a foster nephew or niece. The six households in the village had about 20 people, 3 of whom were foster children, "indicating that fosterage was a very widespread social institution" in the area. Infant mortality was so high in this year first few days of life, the baby wouldn't be named until they were 8 or 9 days old.

As of 2026, it has been known for over 50 years that non-residents owned farmland in the village of Dideiphyta.

As part of its region, Dideiphyta would have been part of the (Arch)Diocese of Hypaepa, in the 4th century CE; in the 20th century, it has been a titular see of the Catholic Church.
