= Thyaira =

Town of ancient Lydia

Coordinates: 38°05′09″N 27°44′39″E

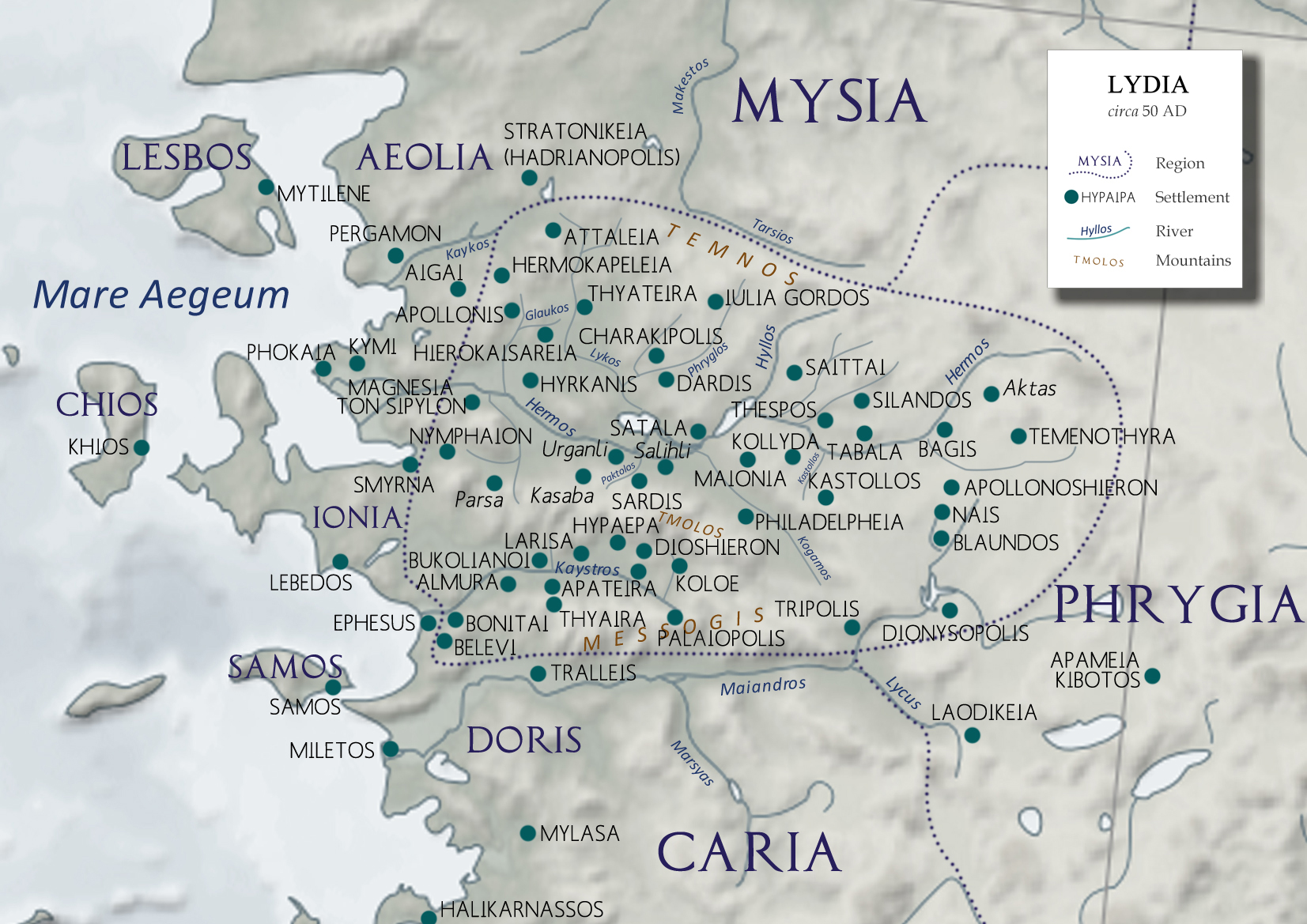
Lydia in about 50CE.

Thyaira was a town of ancient Lydia, inhabited during Roman times.

Its site is located near Tire, Asiatic Turkey.
