= İnkaya Cave =

Cave in İzmir Province, Turkey

- İnkaya Mağarası
- Location within Turkey
- Location: Güzelbahçe, İzmir Province, Turkey
- Coordinates: 38°19′59.7″N 26°49′57.4″E
- Length: 222 m (728 ft)
- Height variation: 5 m (16 ft)

İnkaya Cave (Turkish: İnkaya Mağarası) is a cave located on the eastern slope of Mount Kocadağ at Yelki village in Güzelbahçe, İzmir Province, western Turkey.

The cave is 222 m (728 ft). The dry cave is developed generally horizontal and partly vertical dry cave. Potsherds found in the cave point the cave was used as a settlement in ancient times.

The cave's geological-geomorphological constitution resulted from some intersectional fractures inside a Cretaceous limestone formation. A wide hall is formed after a steep descent. It is about 20 m (66 ft) wide and in average 5 m (16 ft) high. The hall continues in an inclined gallery towards south. At the end of gallery, a 7 m (23 ft)-deep hole leads to the cave's lowest level and the end.
