= Tire meatballs =

Turkish foodstuff

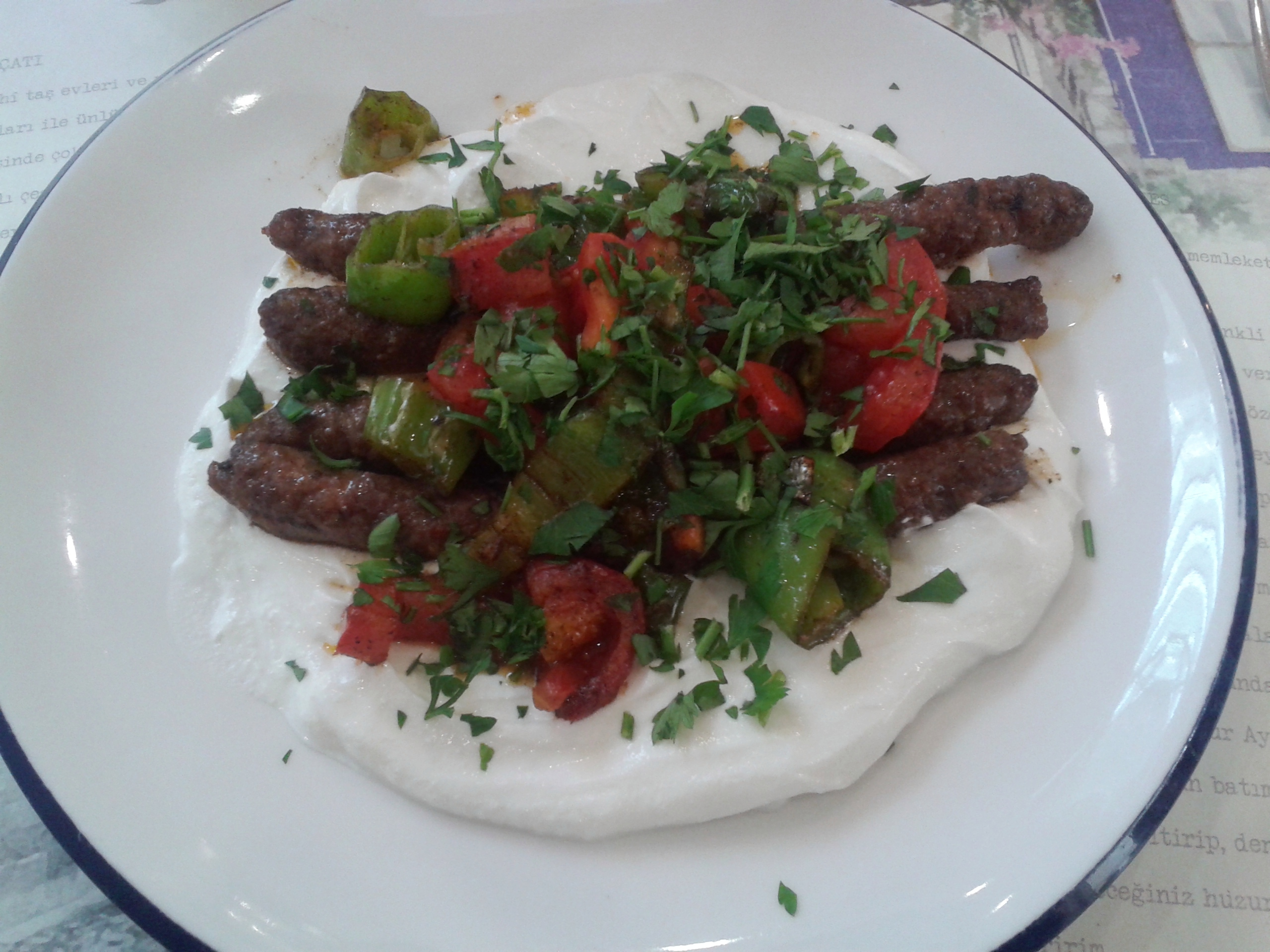
- Course: Main course
- Region or state: Tire, İzmir Province

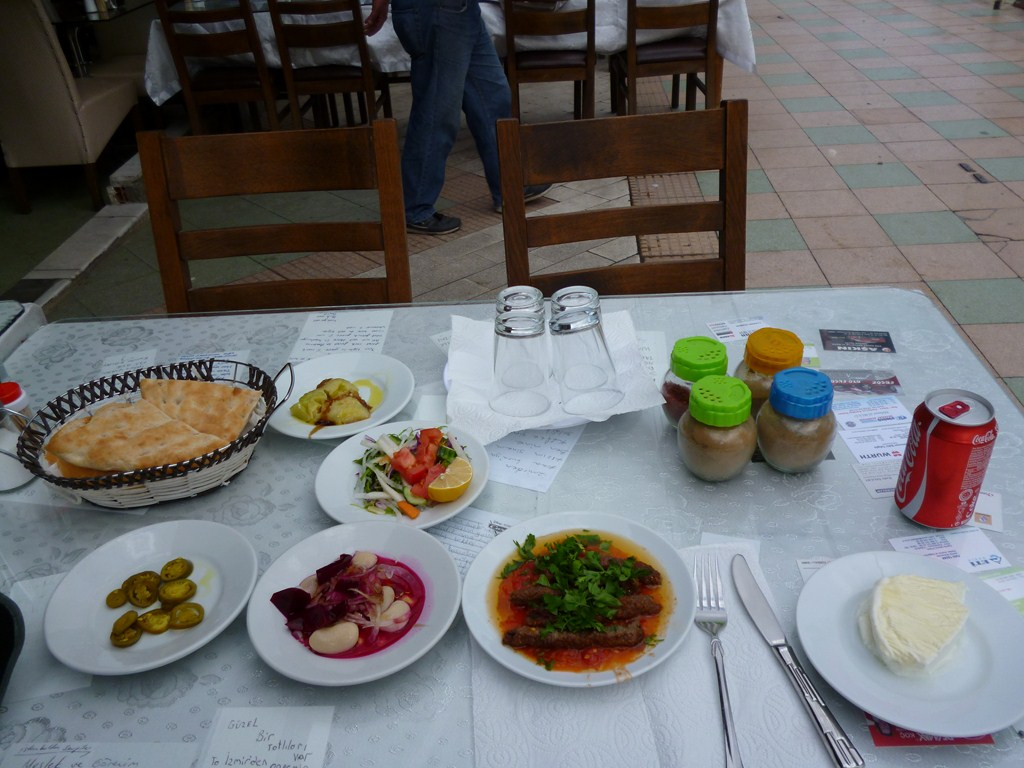

Tire meatballs, which are peculiar to the Tire district of İzmir Province, Turkey, are grilled with a thickness of a pen on thin skewers. No spices other than salt are used in its minced meat; and the meatballs are served with a buttery tomato sauce. The essential taste of Tire meatballs is revealed by the village butter used in its sauce. These meatballs, also known as Delikli (drilled) meatballs and Tire Kebab in the public are served by putting fresh parsley on them. Optionally, Tire meatballs may also be served with yoghurt.

== See also ==
- Kabab koobideh, Iranian minced meat
- Adana kebabı, Turkish minced meat
- Kebapche, Bulgarian minced meat
- Mititei, Romanian minced meat
- Ćevapi, Balkan minced meat
- İnegöl meatballs, Turkish minced meat
- Akçaabat meatballs, Turkish minced meat
- List of meatball dishes
