= Tire, İzmir =

Tire
- District and municipality
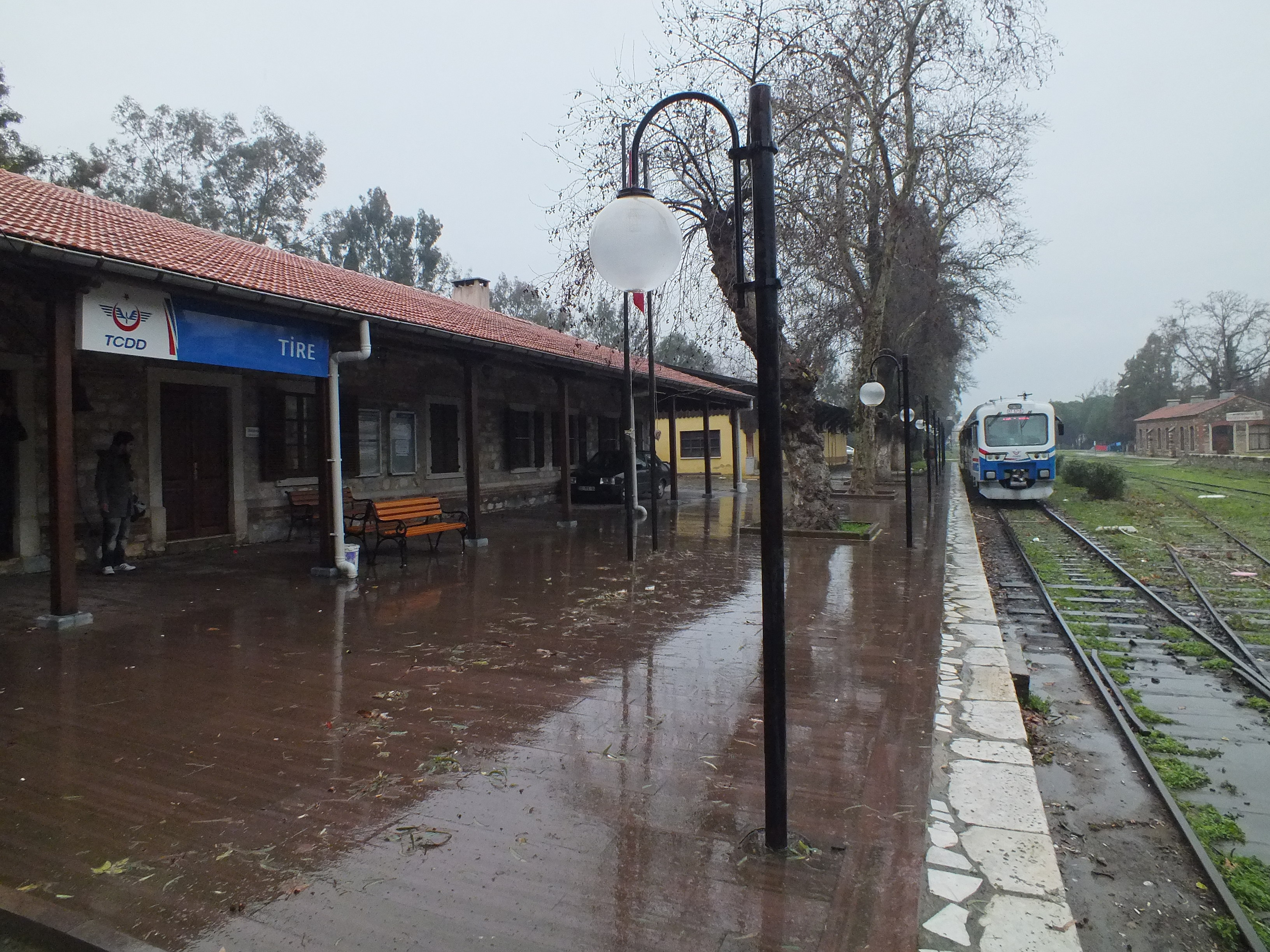
- Tire train station

- Logo

- Map showing Tire District in İzmir Province

- Location within Turkey Location within İzmir
- Coordinates: 38°05′23″N 27°43′55″E
- Country: Turkey
- Province: İzmir

Government
  - Mayor: Hayati Okuroğlu (CHP)
- Area: 716 km^{2} (276 sq mi)
- Elevation: 92 m (302 ft)
- Population (2022): 87,462
  - Density: 122/km^{2} (316/sq mi)
- Time zone: UTC+3 (TRT)
- Postal code: 35980
- Area code: 0232
- Website: www.tire.bel.tr

Tire (Ottoman Turkish: تيره; Greek: Θείρα, romanized: Theíra) is a municipality and district of İzmir Province, Turkey. Its area is 716 km^{2}, and its population is 87,462 (2022). It is largely urbanized at the rate of 55.8%. Tire's center is situated 80 km (50 mi) to the southeast of the traditional center of İzmir (Konak Square in Konak) and 46 km (29 mi) inland from the nearest seacoast in the Gulf of Kuşadası to its west. Tire district area neighbors the district areas of Selçuk (west) Torbalı (north-west), Bayındır (north) and Ödemiş (east), all part of İzmir Province, while to the south it is bordered by Aydın Province. The district area's physical features are determined by the alluvial plain of Küçük Menderes River in its northern part and in its south by the mountains delimiting the parallel alluvial valley of Büyük Menderes River flowing between Aydın and the Aegean Sea. There is a Jewish community.

Advantaged by its fertile soil and suitable climate, Tire district's economy largely relies on production and processing of agricultural products, especially of figs, cotton, corn and other grains, cash crops like tobacco and sesame, fruits like watermelons, cherries, peaches and grenadines and dry fruits like walnuts and chestnuts.

Tire's town center features an attractive old quarter with many impressive examples of Islamic architecture alongside lively Tuesday and Friday markets, where the influence of the multicultural heritage of the surrounding villages can be observed. These weekly markets are widely known throughout the larger region and among visitors on excursion and tourists for their handcrafted items, attracting numerous visitors. Another major annual gathering that also draws crowds to Tire is Nevruz Day. Dating back to 1403, this is one of western Turkey's most vibrant celebrations in western Turkey, held annually on the third Sunday of March.

A famous local speciality is Tire meatballs.

== Etymology and history ==
=== Ancient period ===
Tire center is an ancient town and it had already acquired considerable importance under the rule of the Lydians, called Tyrrha (occasionally spelled Tarrha) at the time and lying in the middle of the road connection between the capital of Lydia and the prominent portuary center of Ephesus.

While there are various suggestions regarding its form, many sources affirm the existence of a fundamental association between the city of Tyrrha and King Gyges of Lydia, who founded Lydia's Mermnad dynasty in the 7th century BC and laid the grounds for the Lydian expansion in the 150 years that followed. Some scholars indicate in all certainty that here was his birthplace, others claim that he first ruled here or the town was founded either by the 7th-century king or a previous namesake. Etymological similarity between the name of the city and such designations as Tyrrhenia, Tyrrhenians and tyrant have also been pointed at or disputed.

The etymology of the name Tyrrha itself was suggested as being an indigenous Lydian language word and explained in terms relative to the English language word "tower".

=== Roman and Byzantine periods ===
During Roman times the city was known as Arkadiopolis, but during Byzantine times the popular name was Thyrea or Thyraia (Greek: Θύραια). Thyraia was sacked by the Menteshe emir Sassan in the late 13th century after he besieged it and starved its residents. After the same emir conquered and sacked Ephesus in 1308, he killed much of its population and deported the rest to Thyraia.

=== Ottoman period ===
Tire developed strong ties with the Ottoman capital and administration, both economically and in terms of its population make-up, especially after the 15th century, since Tire became a retreat where palace personnel, including members of the harem, were sent for their retirement days. Timur (Tamerlane) spent the winter of 1402/1403 based in Tire, after his defeat of the Ottoman forces at the Battle of Ankara, a span of time he used to capture Smyrna lower castle from the Knights of Rhodes, to acquire the city of İzmir fully for the Turks, and his stay here is also at the origin of Tire's noted Nevruz celebrations referred to above. From 1867 until 1922, Tire was part of the Aidin Vilayet of the Ottoman Empire.

=== Jewish presence ===
Before the Ottoman conquest in 1390, there was already a Romaniote Jewish community in Tire. After the Ottomans conquered Constantinople in 1453, some Jews from Tire were forcibly relocated to the new capital. By the late 15th century, much like other cities in Anatolia and the Levant, Tire became a refuge for Sephardic Jews expelled from the Iberian Peninsula. Ottoman records from 1512 to 1530 show a Jewish quarter with 64 households and 18 unmarried Jews.

In the 19th century, the Jewish community in Tire thrived in textiles, agriculture, and various trades. Rabbi Chaim Benveniste, a respected figure, lived there before moving to İzmir as chief rabbi. During the early 1800s, some Jews from İzmir settled in Tire, buying property in Muslim neighborhoods. The 1831 Ottoman census listed 162 Jewish men in the town. Later, during the late 19th century, the Ottoman government allowed Jews fleeing pogroms in the Russian Empire and Eastern Europe to settle in Tire. Fires in 1884 and 1916 heavily damaged the Jewish quarter, but the community endured. By 1908, there were 330 Jewish households, with 1,654 people. The population grew to 1,872 by 1914, and by 1927, the Jewish community reached 1,954 people out of Tire’s total population of 40,456.

The year 1948 was a turning point, as forty Jewish families immigrated to Israel. Over the years, the rest of the families moved to places like Istanbul, İzmir, and eventually Israel. This migration led to a gradual decline of the Jewish presence in Tire. By the early 1990s, around 250 gravestones were still standing in the Jewish cemetery of Tire. However, construction work led to its destruction. Thanks to local residents and the Jewish community of İzmir, the tombstones were relocated to a new site.

In the early 20th century, Tire had three synagogues—Qahal de Abaco, Qahal Şalom, and Qahal de Ariva. The great fire of 1916 destroyed or severely damaged them, but Qahal Şalom was restored in 1937 and remained in use until the 1960s, after which it was converted into a shop. The Midrash Dünyas synagogue, donated by community leader Çelebon Duenyas, stood as a symbol of resilience after the 1916 fire. As of 2010, only Qahal Şalom remains.

== Population and administration ==
The municipality of Tire center is one of the oldest in Turkey, having been established in 1864, coming the ninth across the country in terms of its anteriority. Almost a quarter of the population of Tire village chose outside immigration in the last decade, which was reflected in a slight increase in population for Tire center but contributed to a fall in population of eight percent in the district as a whole. In connection with the same trend, the district receives scanty immigration from outside.

The total number of residences in Tire district reach 36,873. A total number of 16,446 enterprises of all sorts are located in Tire district. Seven banks provide services through seven branches across the district. The number of students per teacher is 18 and the number of patients per doctor is 506.

== Composition ==
There are 88 neighbourhoods in Tire District:

- Adnan Menderes
- Akçaşehir
- Akkoyunlu
- Akmescit
- Akyurt
- Alacalı
- Alaylı
- Armutlu
- Atatürk
- Ayaklıkırı
- Bahariye
- Başköy
- Boynuyoğun
- Büyükkale
- Büyükkemerdere
- Büyükkömürcü
- Cambazlı
- Çayırlı
- Çeriközü
- Çiniyeri
- Çobanköy
- Çukurköy
- Cumhuriyet
- Dağdere
- Dallık
- Dere
- Derebaşı
- Dereli
- Dibekçi
- Dörteylül
- Doyranlı
- Dua Tepe
- Dumlupınar
- Dündarlı
- Eğridere
- Ertuğrul
- Eskioba
- Fatih
- Gökçen
- Halkapınar
- Hasançavuşlar
- Hisarlık
- Hürriyet
- İbni Melek
- İhsaniye
- İpekçiler
- Işıklar
- Işıklı
- İstiklal
- Kahrat
- Kaplan
- Karacaali
- Karateke
- Ketenci
- Kireli
- Kırtepe
- Kızılcahavlu
- Kocaaliler
- Küçükburun
- Küçükkale
- Küçükkemerdere
- Küçükkömürcü
- Kürdüllü
- Kurşak
- Kurtuluş
- Mahmutlar
- Mehmetler
- Musalar
- Ortaköy
- Osmancık
- Paşa
- Peşrefli
- Sarılar
- Saruhanlı
- Somak
- Toki
- Topalak
- Toparlar
- Turan
- Turgutlu
- Üzümler
- Yamandere
- Yeğenli
- Yemişler
- Yeni
- Yeniçiftlik
- Yenioba
- Yenişehir

== Economy ==
Tire municipality's anteriority in terms of its date of constitution was reflected in a number of other fields, which indicates an interest in the region by investors of the late-19th century. A railway line built as a connection joining İzmir-Aydın railway started to be laid in 1893 and a 137 km line connecting Tire and its eastern neighbor Ödemiş to that main axis to the west, itself the very first line placed in the History of rail transport in Turkey, was completed in 1911. The Basmane-Tire Regional railway service now runs from İzmir.

Presently, the district's average per capita income situates Tire roughly in the middle among depending districts of İzmir Province. The investments made to date have yet fallen short of modifying the district's overall economic picture, despite easy access through Selçuk to the close İzmir-Aydın motorway and to Adnan Menderes International Airport thereof. Industrial activities in Tire are concentrated around two industrial zones, the larger one named Tire Organized Industrial Zone (TOSBİ) and the smaller and more locally focused one named Tire Small Industrial Site.

Tourism and related accommodation facilities are still underdeveloped and the accommodation facilities despite the city's potential in terms of cultural tourism and the number of beds available in Tire does not exceed a hundred.

== Notable people ==
• Akylina of Drama (1921-2006) - Orthodox Abbess

== Sources ==
- Günter Dinhobl (2008). Ralf Roth (ed.). Across the Borders: Financing the World's Railways in the Nineteenth and Twentieth Centuries. Ashgate Publishing. ISBN 978-0-7546-6029-3.

·Also,some Tirean groups are migrated to Adana,Ceyhan,Sarımazı on 1860's.It is known that most Sarımazı people are from İzmir,Karatepe.
