= Gereli, Ödemiş =

Gereli
- Neighbourhood
- Location in Turkey Gereli (İzmir)
- Coordinates: 38°12′N 28°03′E
- Country: Turkey
- Province: İzmir
- District: Ödemiş
- Elevation: 130 m (430 ft)
- Population (2022): 955
- Time zone: UTC+3 (TRT)
- Postal code: 35750
- Area code: 0232

Gereli is a neighbourhood in the municipality and district of Ödemiş, İzmir Province, Turkey. Its population is 955 (2022). It is situated to the east of Ödemiş. Distance to Ödemiş is 8 kilometres (5 mi) and to İzmir is 118 kilometres (73 mi).
