= Adana-Yumurtalık Free-Trade Zone =

Port in Turkiye

Adana-Yumurtalık Free-Trade Zone is established for the Ro-ros and other different types of large scale ships to trade between countries in Middle-East and Europe. It is located in Sarımazı town which is in Adana province of Turkey
