= Yeniköy, Ödemiş =

Yeniköy
- Neighbourhood
- Location in Turkey Yeniköy (İzmir)
- Coordinates: 38°13′N 27°54′E
- Country: Turkey
- Province: İzmir
- District: Ödemiş
- Elevation: 170 m (560 ft)
- Population (2022): 839
- Time zone: UTC+3 (TRT)
- Postal code: 35750
- Area code: 0232

Yeniköy is a neighbourhood in the municipality and district of Ödemiş, İzmir Province, Turkey. Its population is 839 (2022). It is situated to the west of Ödemiş. Distance to Ödemiş is 9 kilometres (6 mi) and to İzmir is 104 kilometres (65 mi).
