= Kilizman Martyrdom Monument =

Coordinates: 38°22′42″N 26°53′35″E

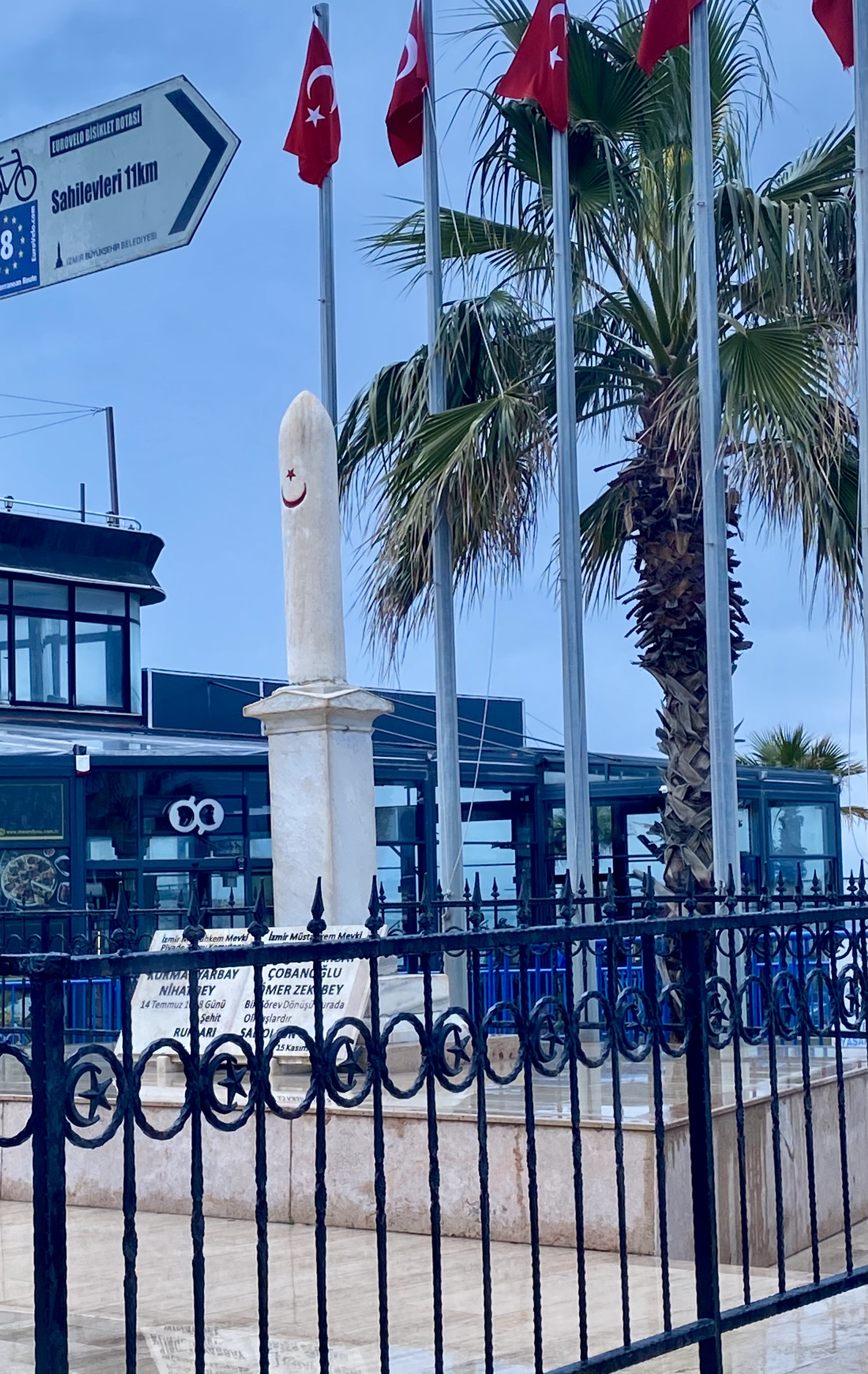
Kilizman Martyrdom Monument

Kilizman Martyrdom Monument is a martyrdom monument built by Kazım Dirik in Güzelbahçe, Turkey. It was built for memory of Turkish soldiers, Staff Colonel Nihat Bey and Çobanoğlu Ömer Zeki Bey, who died in Kahramandere.
