= Günlüce, Ödemiş =

Günlüce
- Neighbourhood
- Location in Turkey Günlüce (İzmir)
- Coordinates: 38°17′N 27°57′E
- Country: Turkey
- Province: İzmir
- District: Ödemiş
- Elevation: 265 m (869 ft)
- Population (2022): 1,227
- Time zone: UTC+3 (TRT)
- Postal code: 35750
- Area code: 0232

Günlüce is a neighbourhood in the municipality and district of Ödemiş, İzmir Province, Turkey. Its population is 1,227 (2022). It is situated to the north of Ödemiş. Distance to Ödemiş is 5 kilometres (3 mi) and to İzmir is 118 kilometres (73 mi). The ruins of the Lydian city of Hypaepa are to the north of the town. During the Seljuks and Ottoman era, the present settlement was known as Dağdibi or Dadbey.
