= Anna Makkavaiou of Asia Minor =

Greek Orthodox nun

Anna Makkavaiou of Asia Minor (Greek: Άννα Μακκαβαίου η Μικρασιάτισσα; 1893–1981) was a Greek Orthodox nun who lived in the Monastery of the Ascension of the Savior in Drama and was an important figure in female Orthodox monasticism.

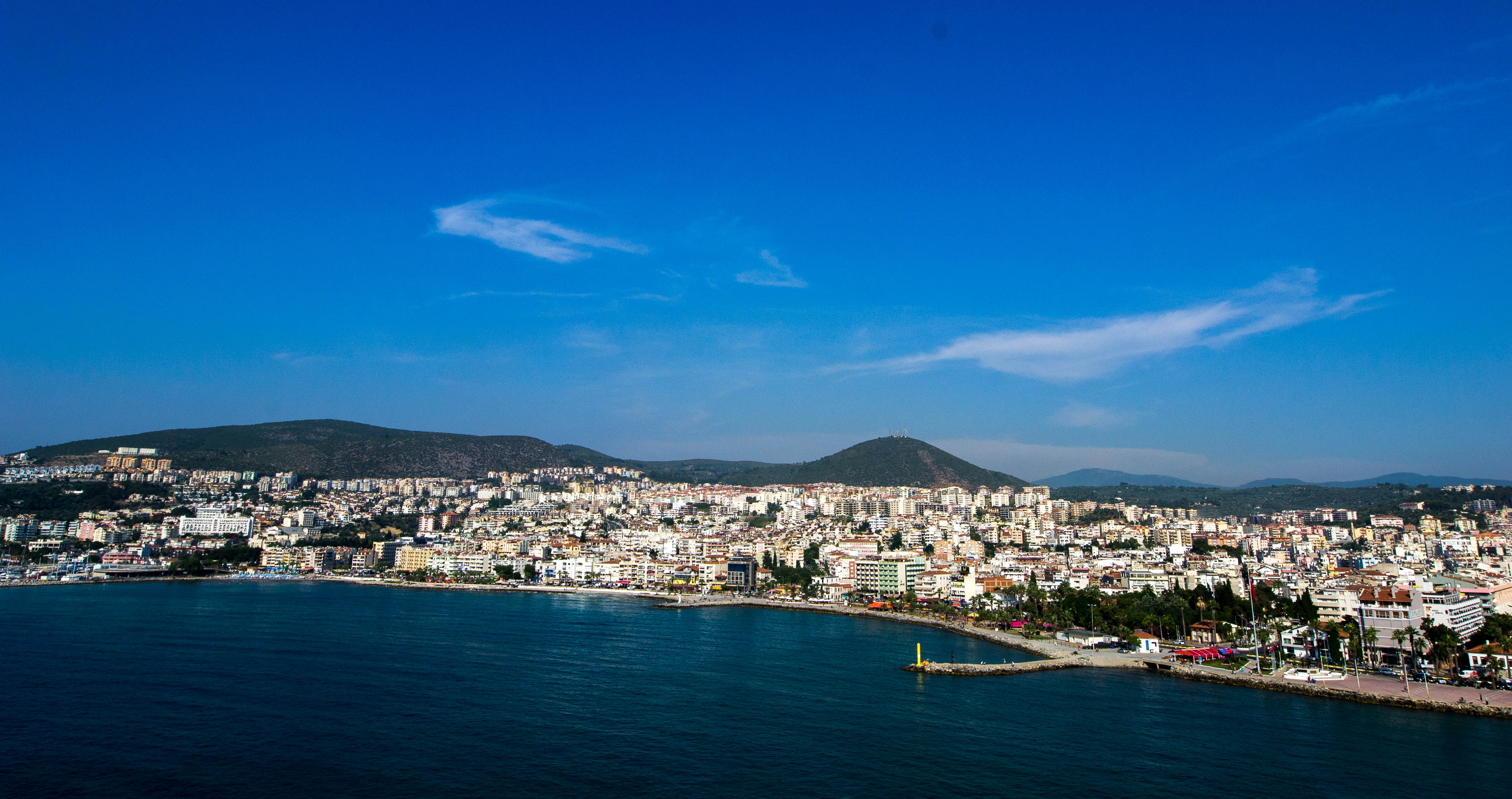
The New Ephesus of Asia Minor.

She was born Athena Makkavaiou in New Ephesus in Asia Minor in 1893. From a young age she was distinguished for her piety, industriousness and kindness. At that time, the fanaticism of the Turks was heightened and that is why parents tried to restore their girls to marriage from a very young age. Thus, Athena also married and had two daughters, Kalliope and Greece.

During the Asia Minor Catastrophe many Greeks of Asia Minor were massacred and those who were rescued left as refugees. Athena's husband was taken prisoner by the Turks and died in the Task Forces.

Remaining a young widow with two young children, she came to Drama together with her mother and many other compatriots, Asia Minor refugees. She worked in a tobacco shop (as the tobacco factories were called). After a short time, her youngest daughter, Greece, died. Athena found herself in great financial difficulty and supplemented her income by embroidering and sewing.

During the Bulgarian Occupation (1941–44) she was persecuted by the Bulgarians and was forced to move to Thessaloniki for protection. She stayed in the house of her daughter Calliope, who had married a few years before.

She was spiritually connected with Saint George of Drama, who tonsured her a nun (made her a nun) with the monastic name Anna. In August 1959 he called her to him and announced to her his impending death (November 4, 1959).

In the desert place of Sipsa where the saint had monasticized, a brotherhood was established in 1970 led by Abbess Akylina. Thus, with the supervision and support of the Metropolitan of Drama Dionysios, a Holy Monastery dedicated to the Ascension of the Savior was founded and developed in the abandoned area with a large sisterhood of nuns.

Then Anna left Thessaloniki, where she lived with her daughter's family, and joined the new sisterhood. She developed all the Christian virtues such as patience and obedience and worked in many manual ministries of the monastery. She had received as a deacon the prayer for those who sought spiritual support from the nuns.

She died on January 12, 1981, in the Ascension Monastery of the Savior of Drama.
