= Kaymakçı =

- Neighbourhood
- Location in Turkey Kaymakçı (İzmir)
- Coordinates: 38°10′N 28°07′E
- Country: Turkey
- Province: İzmir
- District: Ödemiş
- Elevation: 150 m (490 ft)
- Population (2022): 5,489
- Time zone: UTC+3 (TRT)
- Postal code: 35750
- Area code: 0232

Kaymakçı is a neighbourhood in the municipality and district of Ödemiş, İzmir Province, Turkey. Its population is 5,489 (2022). Before the 2013 reorganisation, it was a town (belde).

== Geography ==
Kaymakçı is situated on the southern slopes of a hill and on state highway D.310.The distance to Ödemiş is 17 kilometres (11 mi) and to İzmir is 145 kilometres (90 mi).

== History ==
The area around Kaymakçı was captured by Mehmet of Aydın dynasty in 1308. Although Ottoman Empire annexed the area at the end of the 14th century, after the battle of Ankara, Timur, now the suzerain of Anatolian beyliks, reestablished Aydın authority in 1403. But during the Ottoman revival Ottomans ended the Aydın dynasty in 1426. The settlement was established during the 17th century by a Turkmen tribe. After the first World War the settlement became a battle ground between the advancing Greek army and the militia (Turkish National Movement) of Gökçen Efe. But after Gökçen Efe was killed in November 1919, the settlement was occupied by the Greek army. After the Turkish War of Independence Kaymakçı was returned to Turkey. In 1939 it was declared a seat of township.

== Economy ==
The main agricultural crops are fruits (like plum) and vegetables (like peas and horse bean). The town also hosts an organized industrial estete.
