= Gökçen Efe =

Gökçen Efe (1891 – 16 November 1919) was a Turkish folk hero, who showed bravery during the Turkish War of Independence.

== Life ==
He was born in Ödemiş, İzmir Province. His real name was Hüseyin, but he used the name Gökçen Efe after choosing to live an efe life as an aide to the well-known Çakırcalı Mehmet Efe (1872–1911), who was his relative. After Greek army began invading Turkish territory on 15 May 1919, he began to fight against the regular Greek troops as a guerrilla fighter under the general principles of Turkish National Movement (Turkish: Kuvai Milliye). During the summer of 1919, he fought successfully against the Greek troops usually with hit-and-run tactics. In November, he tried to confront a Greek advance in the village Fata near Ödemiş. But, at the end of a three-day fighting, he died of a bullet wound on 16 November 1919.

== Legacy ==
In 1957, Turkish government renamed the town of Fata, after merging with another settlement, to Gökçen in his honor.
