= Ödemiş railway station =

Railway station in Ödemiş, İzmir, Turkey

ÖDEMİŞ

General information
- Location: İstasyon Cd. 55, Emmioğlu Mah. 35750, Ödemiş, İzmir
- System: TCDD regional rail station
- Owner: Turkish State Railways
- Line: Basmane-Ödemiş Regional
- Platforms: 1 side platform
- Tracks: 1

Other information
- Status: In Operation

History
- Opened: 1884
Location

The Ödemiş station (Turkish: Ödemiş garı) is one of two railway stations in Ödemiş. The Turkish State Railways operates six (seven on weekends) daily trains to and from Basmane station in İzmir. The station was built in 1884 by the Ottoman Railway Company and is the older of the two railway stations in the town.

== Service ==
| Previous | Service | Next |
|---|---|---|
| Beytiköy; Toward Basmane | Basmane-Ödemiş Regional | Ödemiş Şehir; Terminus |
