= Akylina of Drama =

Orthodox nun (1921–2006)

Akylina of Drama (1921–2006) was a Greek Asia Minor Orthodox nun who lived in the Monastery of the Ascension of the Savior in Drama, serving as Abbess. She was significantly active during the National Resistance.

== Biography ==
Erasmia, the daughter of Georgios and Eftychias Parmaxidou, was born in Theira, Smyrna, on 23 April 1921. During the Asia Minor Catastrophe, seven of her relatives were martyred on the gallows, while she and her family left Asia Minor. As refugees they came to Piraeus on 14 September 1922 and a little later they settled in the city of Drama.

The young Erasmia moved with her family to Thessaloniki due to the harsh Bulgarian Occupation in Drama. She offered significant help to people by arranging assistance for the hungry in Lagkadas, as well as participating in the National Resistance, risking her life by feeding the detained resistance Greeks in the Pavlos Melas camp in Thessaloniki which had been turned into a place of detention and torture by the Germans.

In the 1950s, she organized common meals in Drama to address the hardships of the Bulgarian Occupation and set up the camps of the Metropolis of Drama in Granite.

She formed an association with women for the purpose of consecrating them to monasticism. The association headed by Akylina, in April 1970 with the supervision and support of the Metropolitan of Drama Dionysios, settled in the then abandoned area of the Taxiarches of Drama (Sipsa) where there was a nadir of the Ascension of the Savior. On 17 July 1970, and at the age of 50, she assumed the great and angelic shape and was named Akylina nun. Abbess Anna Makkavaiou of Asia Minor, who greatly appreciated Abbess Akylina, joined the brotherhood.

Abbess Akylina, alongside her main spiritual duties, worked for the construction of the Monastery. The entire edifice of the Monastery is the work of her activity together with the first association and the younger nuns. On 25 April 1971, the inauguration of the Holy Monastery took place.

Abbess Akylina died on 16 November 2006.

Saint Paisios characterized her as "Old Woman of Old Women" and Saint Porphyrios of Kausokalyvite called her "Cherub with golden wings".
