= Hypaepa =

- Location within Turkey
- Coordinates: 38°13′52″N 27°58′19″E
- Country: Turkey
- Province: İzmir

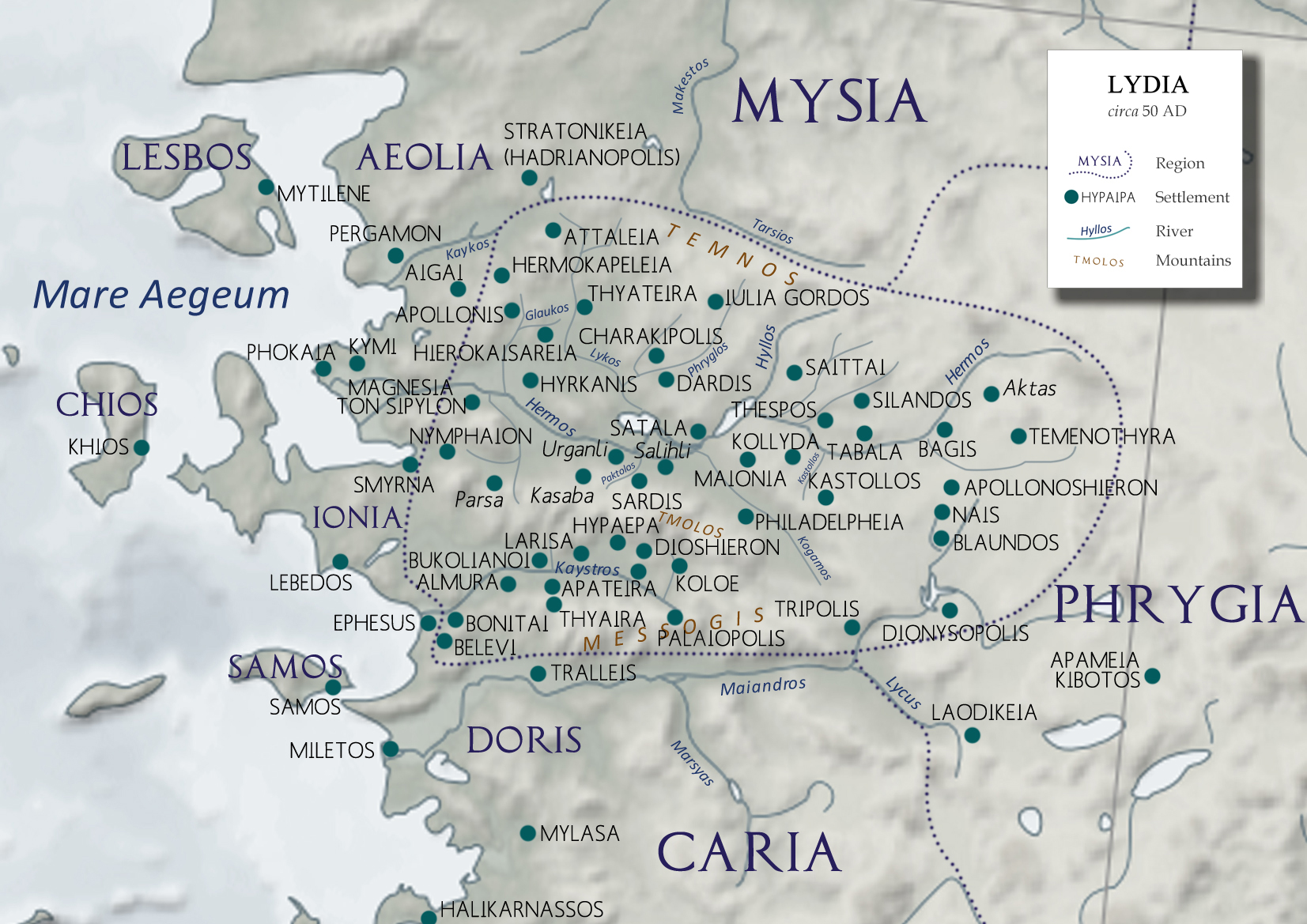
Hypaepa among the cities of Lydia (ca. 50 AD)

Hypaepa or Hypaipa (Ancient Greek: Ὕπαιπα, romanized: Húpaipa) was an Ancient city and (arch)bishopric in ancient Lydia, near the north bank of the Cayster River, and 42 miles from Ephesus, Ephesus and remains a Latin Catholic titular see.

== Name and location ==
Its name was derived from its location at the foot of Mount Aipos (τὰ Ὕπαιπα < τὰ ὑπὸ τὸ Αἴπος, "the place below Aipos"), itself a southern foothill of Mount Tmolus.

Its location was identified by the Frenchmen Cousinéry and Texier and confirmed by the excavations carried out by Demostene Baltazzi on behalf of the Ottoman government in 1892. The ruins are close to the present-day village of Günlüce (earlier known as Datbey or Tapaı; in the Ottoman vilayet of Smyrna), 4 kilometres northwest of the town of Ödemiş.

Its position looking towards the plain of Caystrus, was a strategic one on the route between Sardis and Ephesus.

== History ==
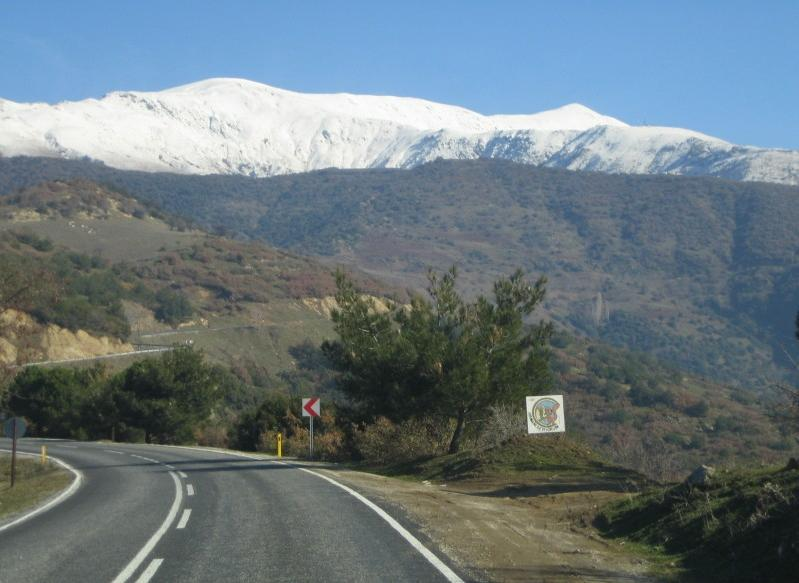
Mount Tmolus

=== Kingdom of Pontus ===
In 88 BC, Hypaepa rebelled against Mithridates VI of Pontus (r. 120-63 BC) and was severely punished.

=== Roman period ===
Under Roman Emperor Tiberius (AD 14-37) it was selection as a candidate for the location of a temple dedicated to worship of the Emperor, but was rejected as being too insignificant.

The Roman poet Ovid contrasted the great city of Sardis with what he called "little Hypaepa": Sardibus hinc, illinc parvis finitur Hypaepis.

Coinage of Hypaepa of the 3rd century AD are extant, until the time of Emperor Gallienus.

Attalus of Hypaepa was a local mentioned in a letter written by Marcus Tullius Cicero to his brother Quintus Tullius Cicero around 61 BC. In that letter, Attalus asks Cicero to intercede with Quintus, then governor of Asia, to ensure that payment already decreed for a statue honoring Quintus Publicius, a close friend of Cicero, would not be blocked. Cicero forwards the request and urges his brother not to hinder the civic honor.

=== Byzantine period ===
To judge by the number of Byzantine churches that it contained, Hypaepa flourished under the Byzantine Empire.

== Mythology and pre-christian religion ==
The women of Hypaepa were reputed to have received from the mythological Aphrodite the gift of beauty of form and dancing Ovid placed at Hypaepa the home of Arachne before she was turned into a spider.

The Persian goddess Anahita, identified with Artemis and therefore called Artemis Anaitis or Persian Artemis, was worshipped at Hypaepa, which had been part of the Achaemenid Empire. However, under the Roman Empire the priests of the temple bore Greek names, not Persian.

Pausanias mentions a rite performed in Hypaepa, in which wood was set alight apparently by magic.

There was a temple of Priapus at the city.

An inscription from the synagogue of Sardis mentions a benefactor who was a member of the council of Hypaepa, indicating the presence there of a Jewish community.

== Ecclesiastical history ==
=== Bishopric ===
Hypaepa was an episcopal see, one of many suffragans of Ephesus, the metropolitan see of the late Roman province of Asia Prima. It remained active until the 13th century.

Under Byzantine emperor Isaac II Angelus Comnenus (1185-1195 and 1203-1204) it became a Metropolitan see.

Lequien (Oriens Christianus I, 695) mentions six bishops: Mithres, present at the First Council of Nicaea in 325; Euporus, at the First Council of Ephesus in 431; Julian, at Ephesus, 449, and at the Council of Chalcedon in 451; Anthony, who abjured Monothelism at the Third Council of Constantinople in 680; Theophylactus, at the Second Council of Nicaea in 787; Gregory, at the Council of Constantinople in 879. To these may be added Michael, who in 1230 signed a document issued by the Patriarch Germanus II (Revue des études grecques, 1894, VII).

=== Titular see ===
The Latin diocese was nominally restored as titular bishopric around 1900 as Hipæpa (Curiate Italian Ipæpa) and renamed Hypæpa in 1933.

It is vacant since decades, having had the following incumbents, all of the lowest (episcopal) rank :

- Edward Gilpin Bagshawe, Oratorians of Philip Neri (C.O.) (1902.01.27 – 1904.01.17), previously Bishop of Nottingham (England, UK) (1874.10.12 – 1901.11.25?), later Titular Archbishop of Seleucia Trachea (1904.01.17 – 1915.02.06)
- Augustin Henninghaus (韓寧鎬), Divine Word Missionaries (S.V.D.) (1904.08.07 – 1939.07.20)
- Raymond Aloysius Lane (林化東), Maryknoll Fathers (M.M.) (1940.02.13 – 1946.04.11)

== Sources and external links ==
- GCatholic with titular incumbent biography links
