= Çaylı, İzmir =

Çaylı
- Neighbourhood
- Location in Turkey Çaylı (İzmir)
- Coordinates: 38°09′N 28°09′E
- Country: Turkey
- Province: İzmir
- District: Ödemiş
- Elevation: 160 m (520 ft)
- Population (2022): 1,434
- Time zone: UTC+3 (TRT)
- Postal code: 35750
- Area code: 0232

Çaylı is a neighbourhood in the municipality and district of Ödemiş, İzmir Province, Turkey. Its population is 1,434 (2022). Before the 2013 reorganisation, it was a town (belde). It is in the plains south east of Ödemiş. Distance to Ödemiş is 13 kilometres (8.1 mi). The earliest records about the settlement are of the 17th century. In 1975 it was declared a seat of township. Main crops are olive and figs. There is also a dairy in the town.
