= Çakırcalı Mehmet Efe =

Çakırcalı Mehmet Efe (1871–1911) was a Zeybek, who was active as an outlaw in the region enclosing İzmir, Aydın, Denizli, Muğla and Antalya in modern western Turkey, from 1893 to 1910. Born in Ödemiş in 1871, he went out to the Aegean mountains at the age of 22 seeking revenge for his father, Çakırcalı Koca Ahmet Efe, who was murdered by an Ottoman sergeant.

While the political standing of Çakırcalı is controversial, he is generally recognized as a legendary efe, who was protective of common people, fought against authority, and established justice in regions of his control. He also called by the Ottoman Empire "kirserdar" in other words commander-in-chief (of an army) a military rank in Ottoman Empire. But he decided to be in charge on his own. In 1911, he was killed by Ottoman security forces during a fight and decapitated by his own men in order to prevent the identification of the body.

Until the year 1948 his body was on the mountain where he was killed; his younger daughter Hatice Akkas brought his body to the graveside Ödemis Kayaköy where her family has a glebe.

There are stories about him that he killed more than 1000 people.

The most famous folk song about him is "Izmir'in Kavaklari". It used to be sung as "Ödemis'in Kavaklari". In 2010 the Ankara State Ballet portrayed his life on stage for the first time. There are also many movies about his life. The first one, Çakırcalı Mehmet Efe (1950), was directed by Faruk Kenc. The part of Efe was played by Turkish actor Bülent Ufuk. There was a sequel to this film, entitled Treasure of Çakırcalı Mehmet Efe (1952). In 1957, Fikret Hakan starred in another film about Efe: Dokuz Dağın Efesi. And in 1969 another film about him was released, starring Kartal Tibet.

The Greek movie Tsakitzis, Protector of the Poor (1960) directed by Kostas Andritsos and starring Andreas Barkoulis is about Çakırcalı's life and is accompanied by songs about him.(Τσακιτζής)

The book about Çakırcalı Mehmet Efe's life is written by Yasar Kemal called Çakırcalı Efe* (The Life Stories of the Famous Bandit Çakircali) (1972).
