= Yelki, Güzelbahçe =

Yelki
- Neighbourhood
- Location in Turkey Yelki (İzmir)
- Coordinates: 38°20′30″N 26°52′0″E
- Country: Turkey
- Province: İzmir
- District: Güzelbahçe
- Population (2022): 6,153
- Time zone: UTC+3 (TRT)
- Area code: 0232

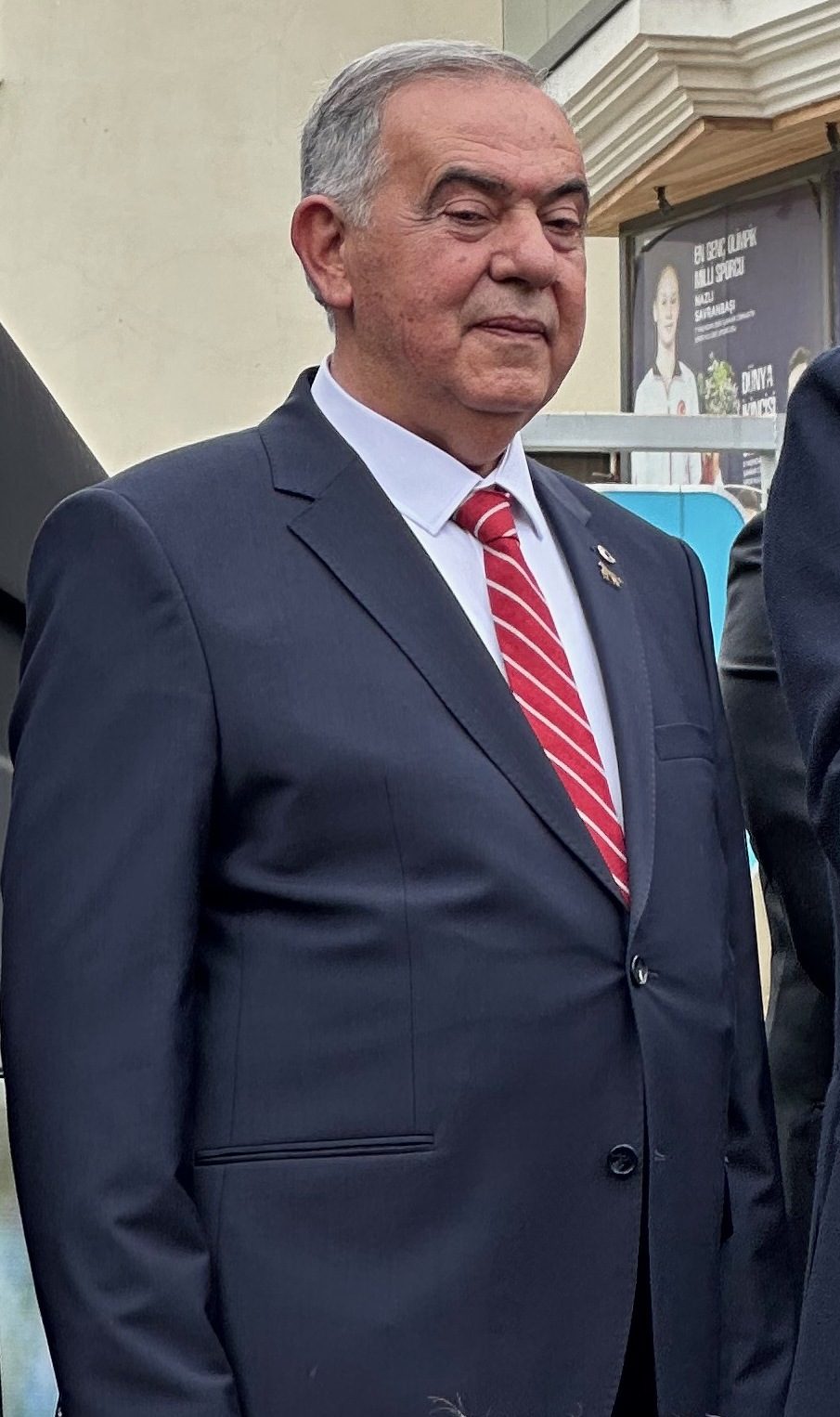
Haydar Altıntaş in Güzelbahçe

Yelki is a neighbourhood in the municipality and district of Güzelbahçe, İzmir Province, Turkey. Its population is 6,153 (2022). Yelki was an independent municipality until it was merged into the municipality of Güzelbahçe in 2008.

== Geography ==
Yelki is 25 km from the center of İzmir. It shares borders with Siteler to the north; Kahramandere to the northeast; Mustafa Kemal Paşa to the east; Çamlı to the south and southwest; and Urla district to the west and northwest. İnkaya Cave is located within the boundaries of the neighbourhood.

== Demographics ==
Historical population
Year	Pop.	±% p.a.
2007	1,237	—
2012	2,214	+12.35%
2017	3,958	+12.32%
2022	6,153	+9.23%
Source: TÜIK (2007-2022)
