= Konaklı, İzmir =

Konaklı
- Neighbourhood
- Location in Turkey Konaklı (İzmir)
- Coordinates: 38°06′N 28°00′E
- Country: Turkey
- Province: İzmir
- District: Ödemiş
- Elevation: 200 m (660 ft)
- Population (2022): 1,511
- Time zone: UTC+3 (TRT)
- Postal code: 35750
- Area code: 0232

Konaklı (former Adagüme) is a neighbourhood in the municipality and district of Ödemiş, İzmir Province, Turkey. Its population is 1,511 (2022). Before the 2013 reorganisation, it was a town (belde). It is situated in the northern slopes of Aydın Mountains. Its distance to Ödemiş is 15 kilometres (9.3 mi). Konaklı was declared a seat of township in 1960. The main agricultural crops are fruits and vegetables. Sericulture is a relatively new activity.
