= Sarımazı =

- Neighbourhood
- Location in Turkey
- Coordinates: 36°58′N 35°58′E
- Country: Turkey
- Province: Adana
- District: Ceyhan
- Population (2022): 3,380
- Time zone: UTC+3 (TRT)

Sarımazı is a neighbourhood of the municipality and district of Ceyhan, Adana Province, Turkey. Its population is 3,380 (2022). Before the 2013 reorganisation, it was a town (belde). It is located on 16 km from Ceyhan towards İskenderun lagoon. It is 2 km from the Mediterranean Sea. The land is spread in Çukurova plain of Turkey.

== Economy ==
The shores of Sarımazı has been declared Industrial region by the state. However, the region is based on agricultural and cattle-breeding activities as well. Especially cotton, corn, wheat, barley, watermelon are widely planted around the town. The town is in Çukurova which is one of the important abundant plains of Turkey. The type of the soil around the town is humus. On the other hand, sheep and goat breeding is one of the main activities in the town.

Beside its village-based activities, there are also industrial factories and Adana-Yumurtalık Free-Trade Zone. On the contrary to south-west section (Antalya-Alanya) of Turkey, the shores of Sarımazı declared as Industrial lands. For this reason, these lands receives so many new residents from different sections of Turkey.

== History ==
The town was received its name from the oak tree which grows widely in this region. Sarımazı was established in 1860 during the Ottoman Era by the Tekeli tribes of Turkomen (Yörük) who were moved from Egean section of Turkey. Their mainlands were Aydın and Manisa province (Sancak-Vilayet); for this reason they are called "Aydınlı Yörüğü" around Çukurova.
