= Kayaköy, İzmir =

Kayaköy
- Neighbourhood
- Location in Turkey Kayaköy (İzmir)
- Coordinates: 38°12′N 27°49′E
- Country: Turkey
- Province: İzmir
- District: Ödemiş
- Elevation: 190 m (620 ft)
- Population (2022): 1,107
- Time zone: UTC+3 (TRT)
- Postal code: 35750
- Area code: 0232

Kayaköy (literally "rock ville") is a neighbourhood in the municipality and district of Ödemiş, İzmir Province, Turkey. Its population is 1,107 (2022). Before the 2013 reorganisation, it was a town (belde). The distance from Kayaköy to Ödemiş is 17 kilometres (11 mi) and to İzmir is 100 kilometres (62 mi).

== History ==
The area around Kayaköy was a zeamet (a kind of fief) during Ottoman era. But beginning by the 19th century, Ottoman government began settling nomadic tribes to former fief lands. A part of the Turkmen tribe of Sarıkeçili from South Anatolia was settled in Kayaköy. Kayaköy was declared a seat of township in 1990.

== Economy ==
Kayaköy is situated in a fertile plain. But irrigation facilities need to be developed. Once popular industrial crops like tobacco and cotton are no more popular. They are replaced by potato, pepper and watermelon. Animal husbandry and dairy farming, the traditional source of living of the nomads, are still popular.

== Trivia ==
The mansion of Çakırcalı Mehmet Efe, a bandit and a folk hero, is in Kayaköy and the governance of İzmir Province has decided to restore the mansion. (His grave is also in Kayaköy.)
