= Gölcük, İzmir =

Gölcük
- Neighbourhood
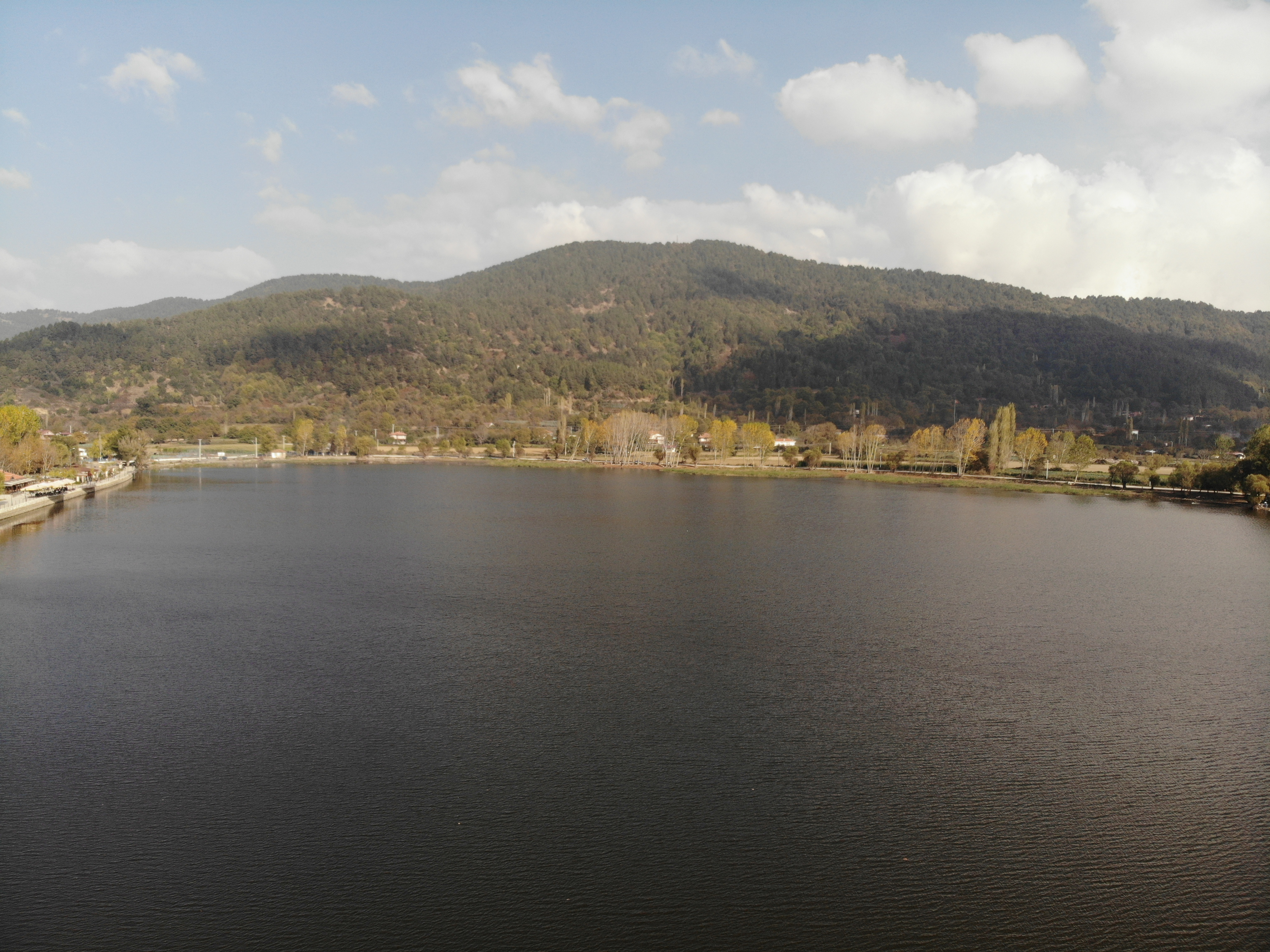

- Location within Turkey Location within İzmir
- Coordinates: 38°19′N 28°02′E
- Country: Turkey
- Province: İzmir
- District: Ödemiş
- Elevation: 1,049 m (3,442 ft)
- Population (2022): 1,305
- Time zone: UTC+3 (TRT)
- Postal code: 35750
- Area code: 0232

Gölcük is a neighbourhood in the municipality and district of Ödemiş, İzmir Province, Turkey. Its population is 1,305 (2022). Before the 2013 reorganisation, it was a town (belde). It is a summer resort, situated around a small mountain lake. The name of the town means Little lake.

The altitude of the lake is 1,049 metres (3,442 ft). It is accessible from Salihli and Ödemiş. Highway distances from certain cities are as follows: 18 kilometres (11 mi) from Ödemiş, 38 kilometres (24 mi) from Salihli, and 120 kilometres (75 mi) from İzmir.

== Administration ==
The municipality of Gölcük has been established in 1968. Gölcük composed one of the two main quarters of the municipality; the other one being Zeytinlik in the plains, closer to Ödemiş.

== Gölcük as a summer resort ==
Gölcük is a popular summer resort (Turkish: yayla) for people from İzmir, Ödemiş etc. Both the lake and the green forest around the village form a picturesque scenery. Most houses belong to people who live in cities and spend hot summer days in Gölcük.
