= Gökçen, İzmir =

Gökçen
- Neighbourhood
- Location in Turkey Gökçen (İzmir)
- Coordinates: 38°07′N 27°52′E
- Country: Turkey
- Province: İzmir
- District: Tire
- Elevation: 130 m (430 ft)
- Population (2022): 907
- Time zone: UTC+3 (TRT)
- Postal code: 35900
- Area code: 0232

Gökçen is a neighbourhood in the municipality and district of Tire, İzmir Province, Turkey. Its population is 907 (2022). Before the 2013 reorganisation, it was a town (belde). It is situated in bottom land and along a tributary of Büyük Menderes River. The distance to Tire is 13 kilometres (8.1 mi) and to İzmir is 90 kilometres (56 mi).

== History ==
The area around the town was inhabited during the Lydian era (6th century BC and before) age. But the town of Gökçen was established in 1957 by merging two villages. Both of villages were Aydınoğlu villages in the 14th century. (Aydınoğlu or Aydın was a Turkmen beylik later merged to Ottoman Empire) One was called Fetih (later Fata) and the other Karaehat (later Kahrat) The new name Gökçen refers to Gökçen Efe a folk hero of Turkish War of Independence, who fell in Fata in 1919.

== Economy ==
Cattle breeding is the most important economic sector of the town. Olives and various fruits are among the main agricultural crops. There is also a tomato sauce factory and a sand quarry in the town.
