= Bozdağ =

- Neighbourhood
- Location in Turkey Bozdağ (İzmir)
- Coordinates: 38°20′21″N 28°4′36″E
- Country: Turkey
- Province: İzmir
- District: Ödemiş
- Elevation: 1,135 m (3,724 ft)
- Population (2022): 508
- Time zone: UTC+3 (TRT)
- Postal code: 35750
- Area code: 0232

Bozdağ is a neighbourhood in the municipality and district of Ödemiş, İzmir Province, Turkey. Its population is 508 (2022). Before the 2013 reorganisation, it was a town (belde). It is at the east of the province on Bozdağ Mountains which it is named after. Distance to Ödemiş is 25 kilometres (16 mi).

== History ==
Mount Bozdag is part of central Menderes Massif, which consists of high-grade gneisses formed in the Early Proterozoic (~1.8 - 2.5 billion years ago).

The ancient name of Bozdağ was Tmolos. It was a border town of Lydian Kingdom in the 6th century BC. After it was plundered by Achaemenid Empire of Persia it lost its importance.

Ibn Battuta visited the Sultan Muhammad, son of Aydin, at his summer retreat located here, spending 14 days. While there Ibn Battuta examined a "stone that fell from the sky".

According to unclaimed reports, during Ottoman era, it was a summer residence of Mehmet II while he was still a prince (Turkish: şehzade) governing in Manisa. In 1963 it was declared a township.

== Economy ==
Fruits and vegetables are produced. At high altitude, the town is cooler than the surrounding and some houses are used as yayla (summer resort) for İzmir or Ödemiş citizens. Winter tourism also seems to be promising.

== Recreation ==
Bozdağ is a beautiful area with Mount Bozdağ which attracts climbers, trackers and skiers. The Bozdağ Mountain is a perfect place for outdoor activities at a suitable altitude. The Mountain Bozdağ has an elevation of 2156 meters with different routes to hike, climb and ski from. Since it is located in a country with high temperatures, weather changes are common around the mountain and there can be unexpected changes which interferes with the plans of hikers, skiers and climbers. Therefore the ski season does not last a long time. The skiing resort on Mount Bozdağ is located 8 km away from the Bozdağ village. It has a cablelift which goes all the way up to the summit but it does not have long skiing pistes. The mountain is fit for trackers mainly during summer since there are no snow. The tracking routes require more skill, technical equipment and climbing knowledge to be able to complete successfully and safely.

== History of climbing ==
Mount Bozdağ has attracted climbers since 1980, mainly climbers from Izmir. The mountain has different routes which can be used by climbers. They come in different difficulty levels and the north face of the mountain has areas with risks of avalanches. There has been 2 deaths during the last 30 years on Mount Bozdağ. One of them due to falling on ice(January 1987), the other due to an avalanche(February 2013). The first climbings were accomplished by IDA (Izmir Dağcılık Ajanlığı-Izmir Mountaineering Agency). The climbers followed a route which started and followed the west ridge of the mountain (this route is now known as "The Classic"). In February 1986, Mount Bozdağ was climbed successfully from the North Face and North Ridge of the Mountain for the first time by Mustafa Arif Demir and Mehmet Akif Demir. The most difficult and technical route of the mountain, Dik Deresi (Steep River) is a mix of rock, ice and snow. The first his route was climbed was in January 1995 by Mustafa Arif Demir and Muammer Yalçın. Ever since, the number of climbers has increased and there now is a winter celebration organized by IDADIK to climb Mount Bozdağ through different routes. One of the oldest climbing clubs in Turkey, IDADIK (Izmir Moutaineering and Nature Sports Speciality Club) encourages young climbers and people to climb and learn about the mountains in Turkey.

== See also ==
- Mount Tmolus
