= Bademli, Ödemiş =

Bademli
- Neighbourhood
- Location in Turkey Bademli (İzmir)
- Coordinates: 38°04′N 28°04′E
- Country: Turkey
- Province: İzmir
- District: Ödemiş
- Elevation: 370 m (1,210 ft)
- Population (2022): 2,422
- Time zone: UTC+3 (TRT)
- Postal code: 35750
- Area code: 0232

Bademli is a neighbourhood in the municipality and district of Ödemiş, İzmir Province, Turkey. Its population is 2,422 (2022). Before the 2013 reorganisation, it was a town (belde). It is situated to the south of Ödemiş and in the irrigation area of Küçükmenderes River (Cayster of the antiquity). Distance to Ödemiş is 19 kilometres (12 mi) and to İzmir is 120 kilometres (75 mi).

Bademli was declared a seat of township in 1932. Main economic activity is agriculture. Cherries and other fruits are produced. The village is one of the important centers of arboriculture. There is also some light industry in the village, such as olive mills and mineral water installations.
