= Ödemiş =

- District and municipality
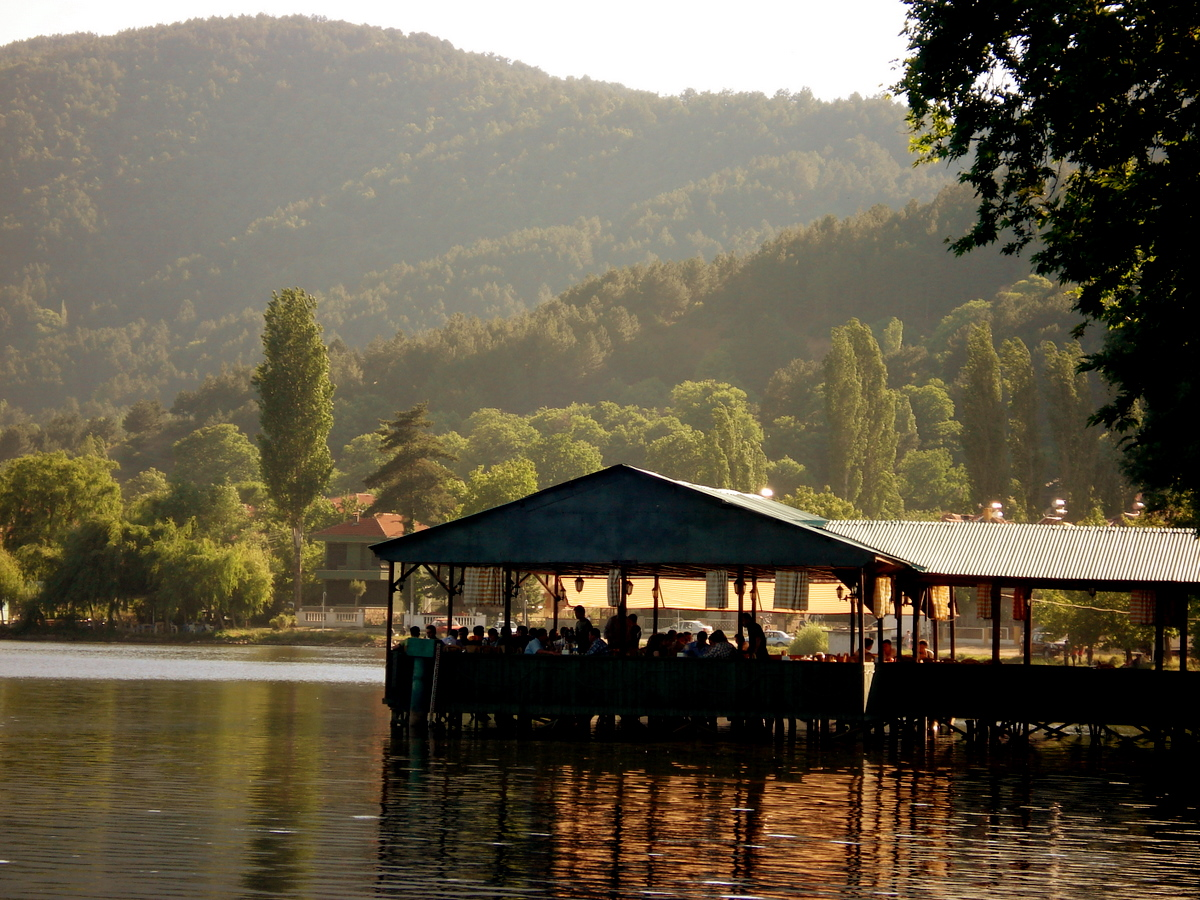
- Lake Gölcük on Bozdağ Mountains

- Logo

- Map showing Ödemiş District in İzmir Province

- Location within Turkey Location within İzmir
- Coordinates: 38°13′52″N 27°58′19″E
- Country: Turkey
- Province: İzmir

Government
  - Mayor: Mustafa Turan (CHP)
- Area: 1,019 km^{2} (393 sq mi)
- Elevation: 136 m (446 ft)
- Population (2022): 132,740
  - Density: 130.3/km^{2} (337.4/sq mi)
- Time zone: UTC+3 (TRT)
- Postal code: 35750
- Area code: 0232
- Website: www.odemis.bel.tr

Ödemiş (Turkish: [ˈœdemiʃ]) is a municipality and district of İzmir Province, Turkey. Its area is 1,019 km^{2}, and its population is 132,740 (2022). It is located 113 km southeast of the city of İzmir.

About 4 km north of Ödemiş town are the ruins of Hypaepa. The historical importance of the region is also reflected by the small town of Birgi, east of Ödemiş, which was the capital of the Aydınids, which has examples of Seljuq and Ottoman architecture. Birgi has been on the tentative UNESCO World Cultural Heritage list since 2012, and points of interest here include Çakırağa Mansion, İmam-i Birgivi Medrese and Sultanşah Mausoleum. Ödemiş is famous for its potatoes, which has the best quality in Turkey, as well as its "Ödemiş Kebab". The city is the biggest potato grower of Turkey with its annual 350,000 tons of potato production.

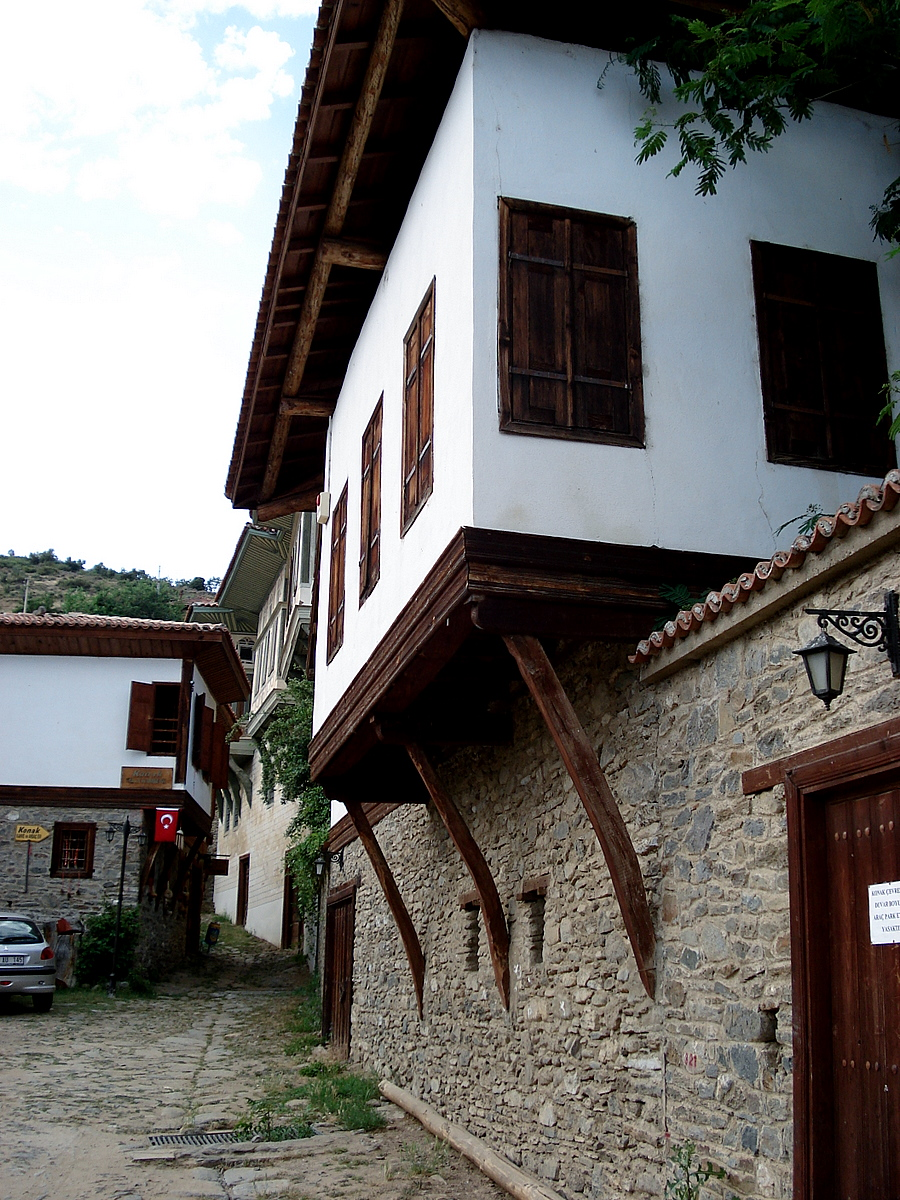
Birgi, a small town near Ödemiş

== History ==
From 1867 until 1922, Ödemiş was part of the Aidin Vilayet of the Ottoman Empire.

== Composition ==
There are 99 neighbourhoods in Ödemiş District:

- 3 Eylül
- Akıncılar
- Alaşarlı
- Anafartalar
- Artıcak
- Atatürk
- Bademli
- Balabanlı
- Bayırlı
- Bengisu
- Beyezitlar
- Bıçakçı
- Birgi
- Bozcayaka
- Bozdağ
- Bucak
- Bülbüller
- Büyükavulcuk
- Çağlayan
- Çamlıca
- Çamyayla
- Çayır
- Çaylı
- Cevizalan
- Çobanlar
- Cumhuriyet
- Demircili
- Demirdere
- Derebebekler
- Dereuzunyer
- Dolaylar
- Emirli
- Emmioğlu
- Ertuğrul
- Gerçekli
- Gereli
- Gölcük
- Güney
- Günlüce
- Hacıhasan
- Hamam
- Horzum
- Hürriyet
- İlkkurşun
- İnönü
- Işık
- Karadoğan
- Karakova
- Kayaköy
- Kaymakçı
- Kazanlı
- Kemenler
- Kemer
- Kerpiçlik
- Kışla
- Kızılca
- Kızılcaavlu
- Köfündere
- Konaklı
- Köseler
- Küçükavulcuk
- Küçükören
- Küre
- Kurucuova
- Kutlubeyler
- Kuvvetli
- Mescitli
- Meşrutiyet
- Mimarsinan
- Mursallı
- Ocaklı
- Oğuzlar
- Orhangazi
- Ortaköy
- Ovacık
- Ovakent
- Pirinççi
- Sekiköy
- Seyrekli
- Şirinköy
- Suçıktı
- Süleyman Demirel
- Süleymanlar
- Tekke
- Tosunlar
- Türkmen
- Türkönü
- Üçkonak
- Umurbey
- Üzümlü
- Uzundere
- Veliler
- Yeniceköy
- Yeniköy
- Yeşilköy
- Yılanlı
- Yolüstü
- Yusufdere
- Zafer

== Climate ==
Climate data for Ödemiş (1991–2020)
Month	Jan	Feb	Mar	Apr	May	Jun	Jul	Aug	Sep	Oct	Nov	Dec	Year
Mean daily maximum °C (°F)	12.8 (55.0)	14.2 (57.6)	17.5 (63.5)	22.0 (71.6)	28.0 (82.4)	33.2 (91.8)	36.2 (97.2)	36.3 (97.3)	31.7 (89.1)	25.9 (78.6)	19.4 (66.9)	14.1 (57.4)	24.3 (75.7)
Daily mean °C (°F)	7.1 (44.8)	8.4 (47.1)	11.0 (51.8)	14.9 (58.8)	20.1 (68.2)	25.0 (77.0)	27.6 (81.7)	27.5 (81.5)	22.9 (73.2)	17.7 (63.9)	12.1 (53.8)	8.4 (47.1)	16.9 (62.4)
Mean daily minimum °C (°F)	2.5 (36.5)	3.3 (37.9)	4.9 (40.8)	8.1 (46.6)	12.3 (54.1)	16.1 (61.0)	18.3 (64.9)	18.4 (65.1)	14.4 (57.9)	10.6 (51.1)	6.1 (43.0)	3.9 (39.0)	9.9 (49.8)
Average precipitation mm (inches)	88.49 (3.48)	80.45 (3.17)	64.7 (2.55)	52.47 (2.07)	36.71 (1.45)	12.46 (0.49)	4.08 (0.16)	2.09 (0.08)	17.69 (0.70)	36.63 (1.44)	75.36 (2.97)	89.85 (3.54)	560.98 (22.09)
Average precipitation days (≥ 1.0 mm)	8.5	7.5	6.9	6.2	5	2.6	1.4	1.3	2.6	3.9	5.9	9	60.8
Average relative humidity (%)	77.4	74.5	70.5	67.9	61.7	52.9	50.9	52.4	58.7	68.1	74.1	78.8	65.4
Source: NOAA

== Transport ==
See also:

- Ödemiş railway station
- Basmane-Ödemiş Regional – the railway service from Basmane Terminal in İzmir.

== Notable people ==
- Muzafer Sherif (1906-1988), a Turkish-American social psychologist
- Çakırcalı Mehmet Efe (1872 kayaköy-Ödemiş – ö. 17 Kasım 1911 ) the legendary hero
- Gökçen Efe (1881-1919), folk hero of the Turkish War of Independence
- Şükrü Saracoğlu, 5th Prime Minister of Turkey

== Twin towns ==
- Bilecik, Turkey
- Mátranovák, Hungary
- Zenica, Bosnia and Herzegovina
- Defne, Turkey
