= Güzelbahçe =

- District and municipality
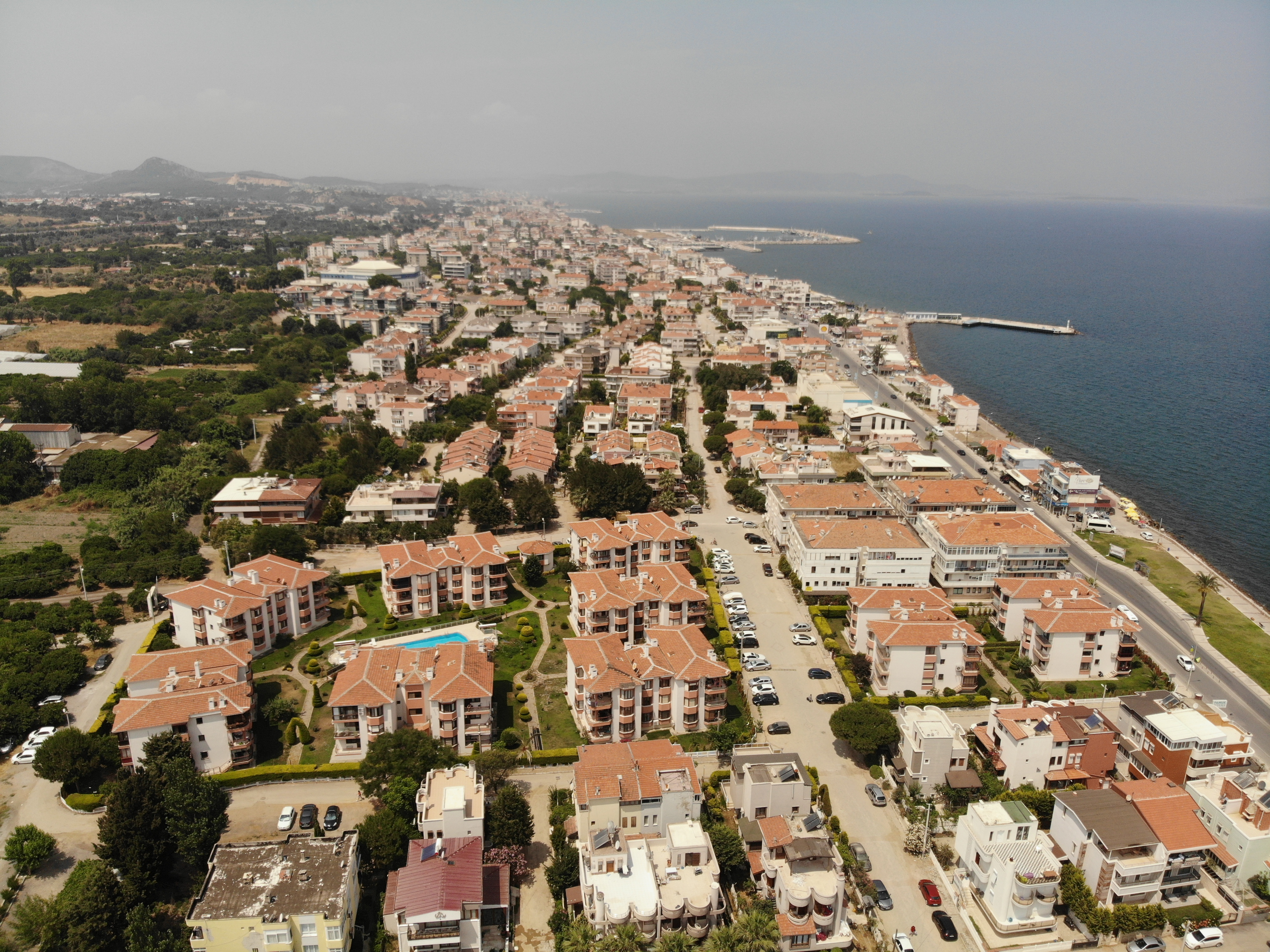

- Map showing Güzelbahçe District in İzmir Province

- Location within Turkey Location within İzmir
- Coordinates: 38°20′08″N 26°53′28″E
- Country: Turkey
- Province: İzmir

Government
  - Mayor: Özdem Mustafa İnce (CHP)
- Area: 77 km^{2} (30 sq mi)
- Population (2022): 37,753
  - Density: 490/km^{2} (1,300/sq mi)
- Time zone: UTC+3 (TRT)
- Postal code: 35310
- Area code: 0232
- Website: www.guzelbahce.bel.tr

Güzelbahçe is a municipality and district of İzmir Province, Turkey. Its area is 77 km^{2}, and its population is 37,753 (2022). It is situated on the southern coast of the Gulf of İzmir, west of the city centre of İzmir.

The district's overall levels of education and income care among the highest in Turkey, the literacy rate reaching 90 per cent, and the average yearly income per inhabitant calculated to be 13.054 US Dollars, as a consequence of the choice of Güzelbahçe as domicile by many among the affluent classes of İzmir in the last decade, who continue to settle in housing projects of villa-type residences built in Güzelbahçe and its dependencies. Construction of luxury homes and settlement by many residents with U.S. or European educational and professional backgrounds resulted in the appearance of American-style suburban living in certain parts of the district. Nevertheless, the subsistence of a part of the population, usually older settlers, is still derived from local activities such as fishing, viniculture, other forms of agriculture - particularly greenhouse cultivation with emphasis on production of decorative plants and flowers - and sections in the district retain their rural character.

== Geography ==
Güzelbahçe district area follows a section in the southern shore of the inner Gulf of İzmir alongside a narrow coastal strait delimited by mid-height hills. Güzelbahçe center is at a distance of 24 km (15 mi) to the west from the traditional center of İzmir (Konak). Güzelbahçe district area further neighbours the districts of Urla to the west, Menderes and Seferihisar to the south and Narlıdere and Karabağlar to the east.

Although Güzelbahçe seems very urbanized at the rate of 82.7 percent, there are relatively remote villages in the Southern part of the district. These villages like Payamlı are known for their grapes grown on mostly steep hills and mountains.

== History ==
In the first years of the Republic of Turkey, Güzelbahçe was a village depending on Urla district and was named "Kilizman", a name which makes reference to the ancient city of Klazomenai, located today in Urla quay. In 1936, its population already having exceeded two thousand people, its municipal administration was formed, which still depended Urla at the time, and its name was changed into "Kızılbahçe" (red garden). In 1958, its municipal area was separated from Urla district and was attached to İzmir center, and the name was changed into Güzelbahçe (the beautiful garden) for the first time, reportedly to avoid political connotations associated with the color "Red" at the height of the Cold War. In 1980, the municipality was abolished and the town became a neighbourhood of İzmir. This state of administration was pursued when an İzmir Metropolitan Municipality with depending districts, of which Güzelbahçe is one today, was constituted in 1984. In 1988, Güzelbahçe became part of Konak metropolitan district. In 1992, the two neighborhoods Güzelbahçe and Narlıdere were combined and a new district under the name, "Narlıbahçe" (which gives the meaning, "garden of pomegranates"), a combination based on part of each one's name, was formed. In 1993, both Güzelbahçe and Narlıdere became distinct metropolitan districts under their present names. The name Kilizman is still used by the population for the coastal strait.

The district of Güzelbahçe received its present boundaries after giving village of Çamtepe to Seferihisar district by decree in 2001. Yelki town municipality and Çamlık village became part of Güzelbahçe Municipality in 2009.

== Composition ==
There are 12 neighbourhoods in Güzelbahçe District:

- Atatürk
- Çamlı
- Çelebi
- Kahramandere
- Küçükkaya
- Maltepe
- Mustafa Kemal Paşa
- Payamlı
- Siteler
- Yaka
- Yalı
- Yelki

== Economy ==
Both in outlook and in its economy, Güzelbahçe displays particularities of a freshly constituted administrative entity. The total number of residences is 6,510, some of which are seasonal, which leads to variations of around ten thousand people between summer and winter in Güzelbahçe center's constant population of nineteen thousand. Slum-type residences are virtually non-existent in Güzelbahçe.

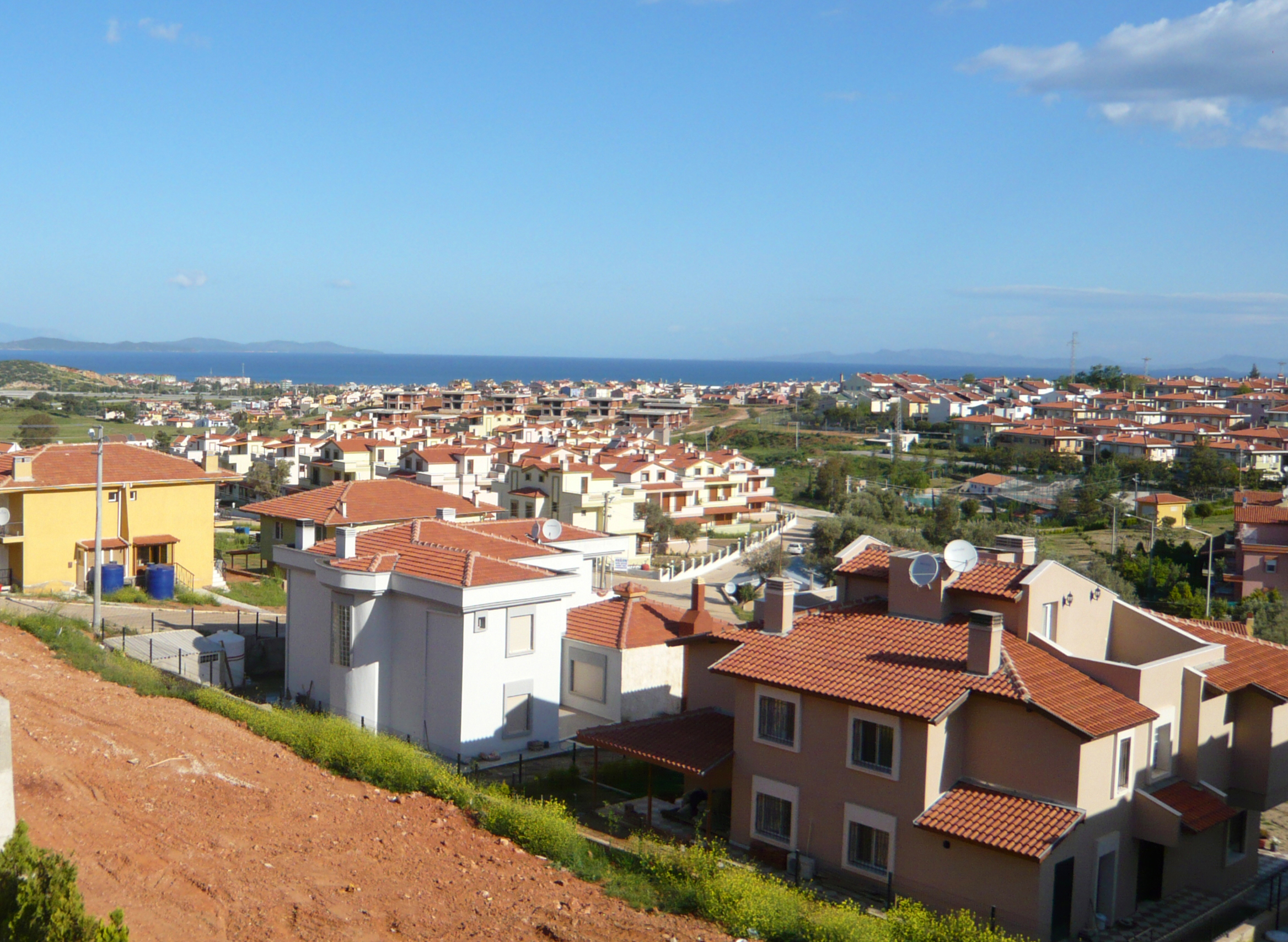

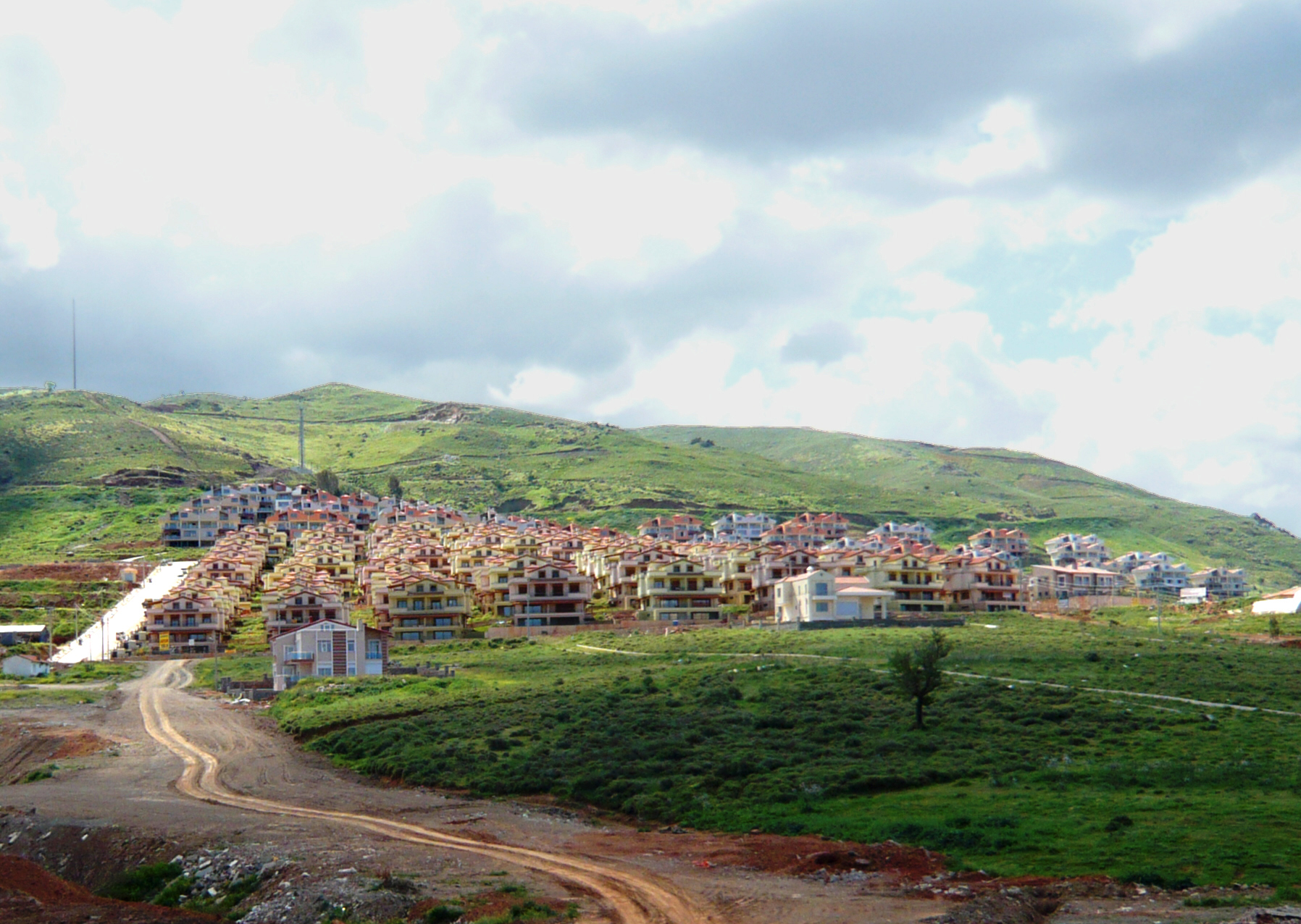

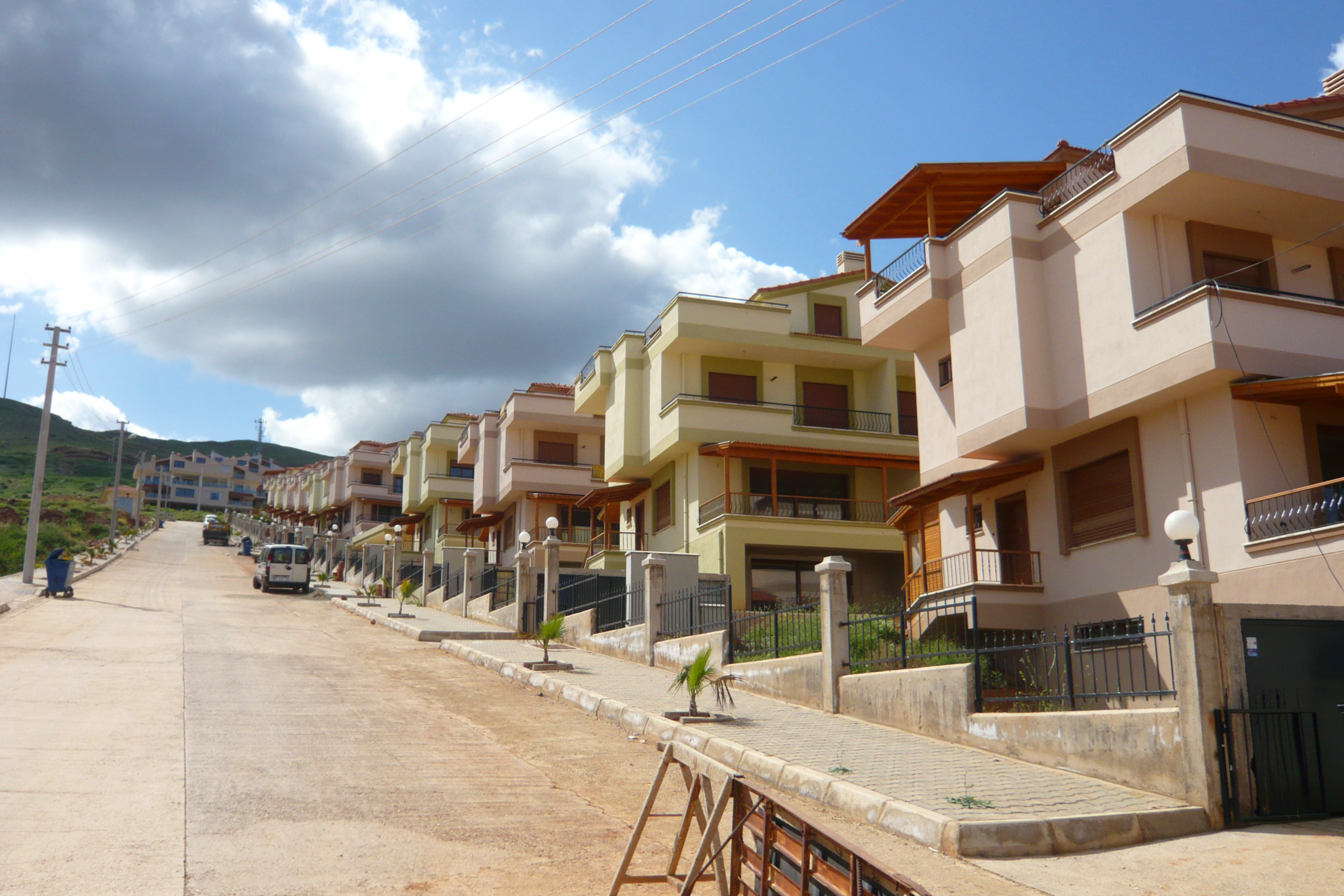

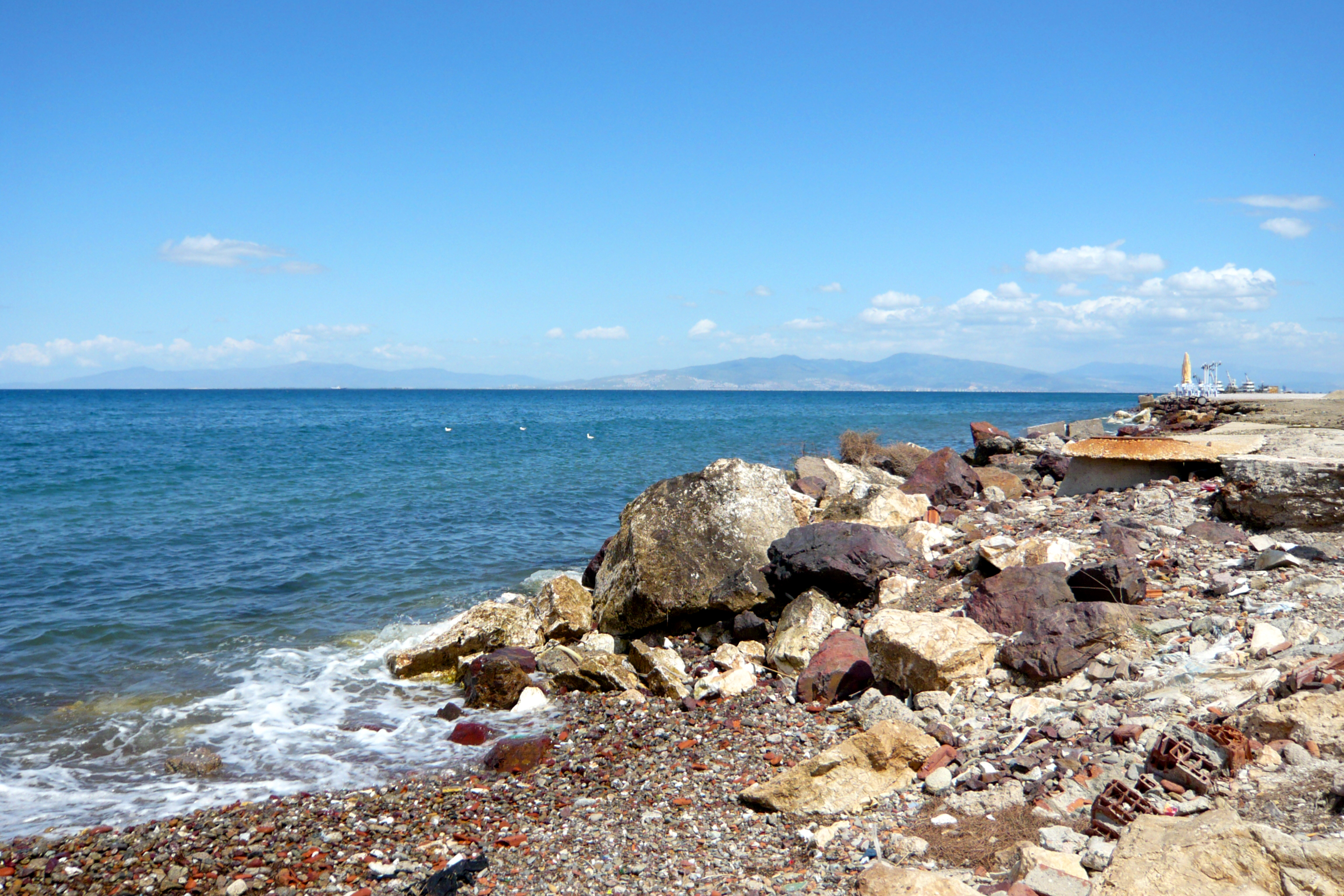

The total number of enterprises present in the district is 144. There is one hotel with 40 beds and there are three banks providing services through three branches in Güzelbahçe. On the other hand, figures relating to education present the outlook of a comfortable settlement in this regard, with 13 students for each teacher. The mountains covered with pine forests which mark Güzelbahçe's southern borders and which covers more than one third of the total district area are favorite spots for excursions for the inhabitants of İzmir as a whole, especially during weekends and holidays. Land used for agricultural purposes constitute slightly less than one third of the total district area in Güzelbahçe.

== See also ==
- Kilizman Martyrdom Monument
