= Islamic geometric patterns =

Geometric pattern characteristic of Muslim art

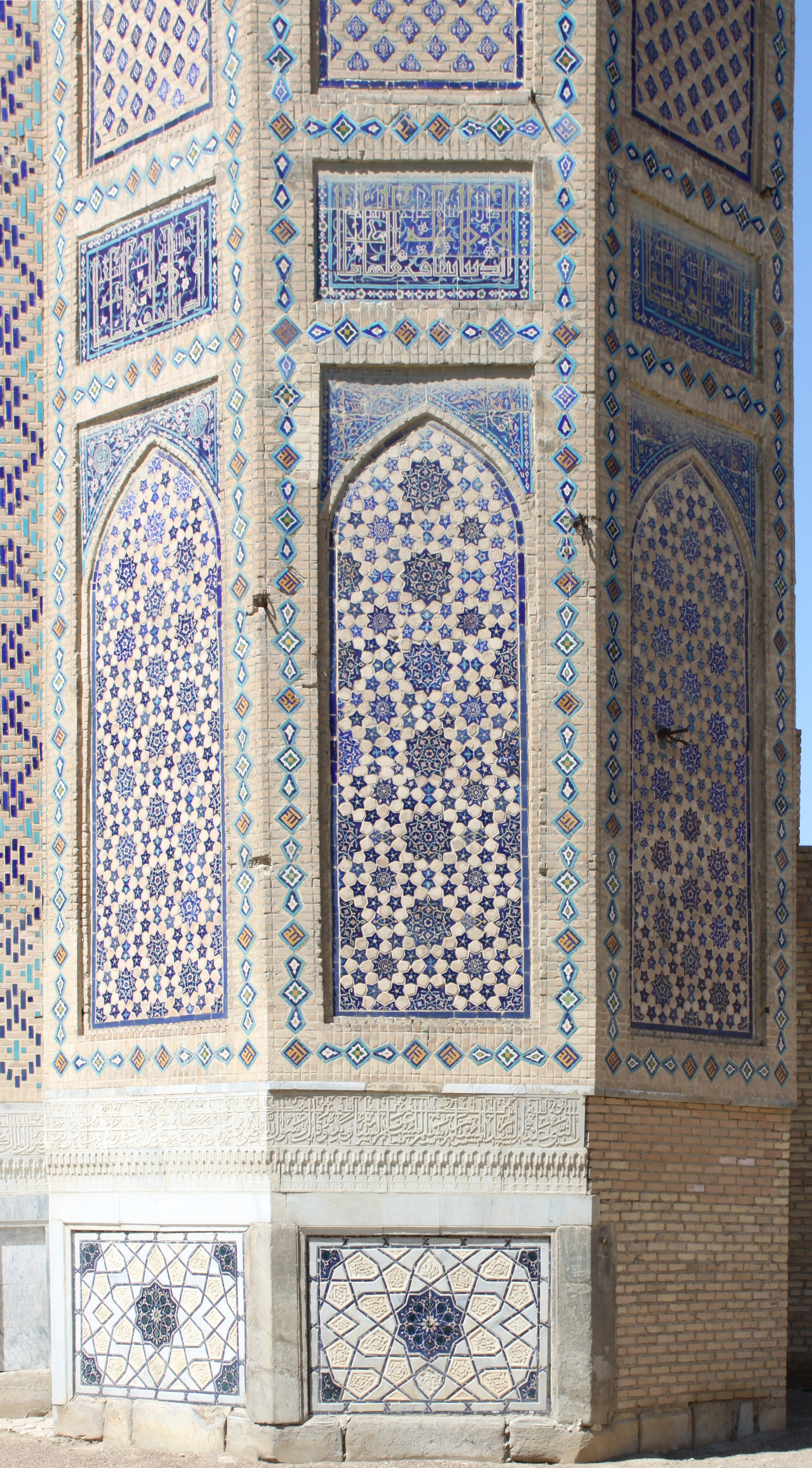
Detail of minaret socle of the Bibi Khanum Mosque, Samarkand, Uzbekistan.The arched vertical panels are decorated with different geometric patterns, featuring 10-, 8- and 5-pointed stars.

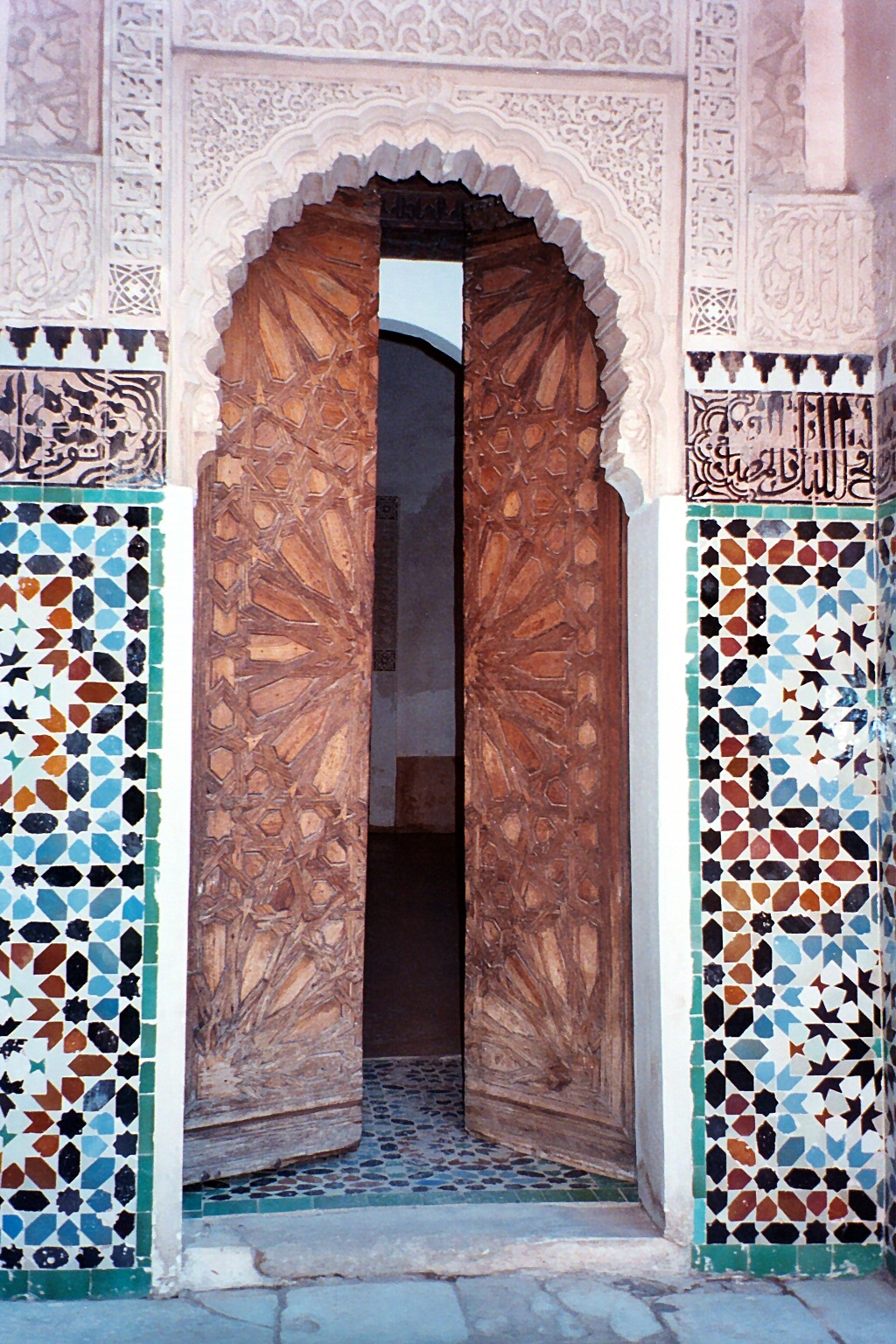
A doorway in Ben Youssef Madrasa, Marrakesh. The Atlas cedar doors have carved strapwork with a 16-point star. The arch is surrounded with arabesques; to either side is a band of Islamic calligraphy, above zellij tilework.

Islamic geometric patterns are one of the major forms of Islamic ornament, which tends to avoid using figurative images, as it is forbidden to create a representation of an important Islamic figure according to many holy scriptures.

The geometric designs in Islamic art are often built on combinations of repeated squares and circles, which may be overlapped and interlaced, as can arabesques (with which they are often combined), to form intricate and complex patterns, including a wide variety of tessellations. These may constitute the entire decoration, may form a framework for floral or calligraphic embellishments, or may retreat into the background around other motifs. The complexity and variety of patterns used evolved from simple stars and lozenges in the ninth century, through a variety of 6- to 13-point patterns by the 13th century, and finally to include also 14- and 16-point stars in the sixteenth century.

Geometric patterns occur in a variety of forms in Islamic art and architecture. These include kilim carpets, Persian girih and Moroccan zellij tilework, muqarnas decorative vaulting, jali pierced stone screens, ceramics, leather, stained glass, woodwork, and metalwork.

Interest in Islamic geometric patterns is increasing in the West, both among craftsmen and artists like M. C. Escher in the twentieth century, and among mathematicians and physicists such as Peter J. Lu and Paul Steinhardt.

== Background ==
=== Islamic decoration ===
Islamic geometric patterns are derived from simpler designs used in earlier cultures: Greek, Roman, and Sasanian. They are one of three forms of Islamic decoration, the others being the arabesque based on curving and branching plant forms, and Islamic calligraphy; all three are frequently used together. From the 9th century onward, a range of sophisticated geometric patterns based on polygonal tessellation began to appear in Islamic art, eventually becoming dominant.

Islamic art mostly avoids figurative images to avoid becoming objects of worship. This aniconism in Islamic culture caused artists to explore non-figural art, and created a general aesthetic shift toward mathematically based decoration.

=== Purpose ===
Authors such as Keith Critchlow (Note: Critchlow is a professor of architecture, and the author of a book on Islamic patterns.) argue that Islamic patterns are created to lead the viewer to an understanding of the underlying reality, rather than being mere decoration, as writers interested only in pattern sometimes imply. In Islamic culture, the patterns are believed to be the bridge to the spiritual realm, the instrument to purify the mind and the soul. David Wade (Note: Wade is the author of a series of books on pattern in various artforms.) states that "Much of the art of Islam, whether in architecture, ceramics, textiles or books, is the art of decoration – which is to say, of transformation." Wade argues that the aim is to transfigure, turning mosques "into lightness and pattern", while "the decorated pages of a Qur’an can become windows onto the infinite." Against this, Doris Behrens-Abouseif (Note: Behrens-Abouseif is a professor of the history of art and architecture at SOAS.) states in her book Beauty in Arabic Culture that a "major difference" between the philosophical thinking of Medieval Europe and the Islamic world is exactly that the concepts of the good and the beautiful are separated in Arabic culture. She argues that beauty, whether in poetry or in the visual arts, was enjoyed "for its own sake, without commitment to religious or moral criteria".

Styles of Islamic geometric decoration

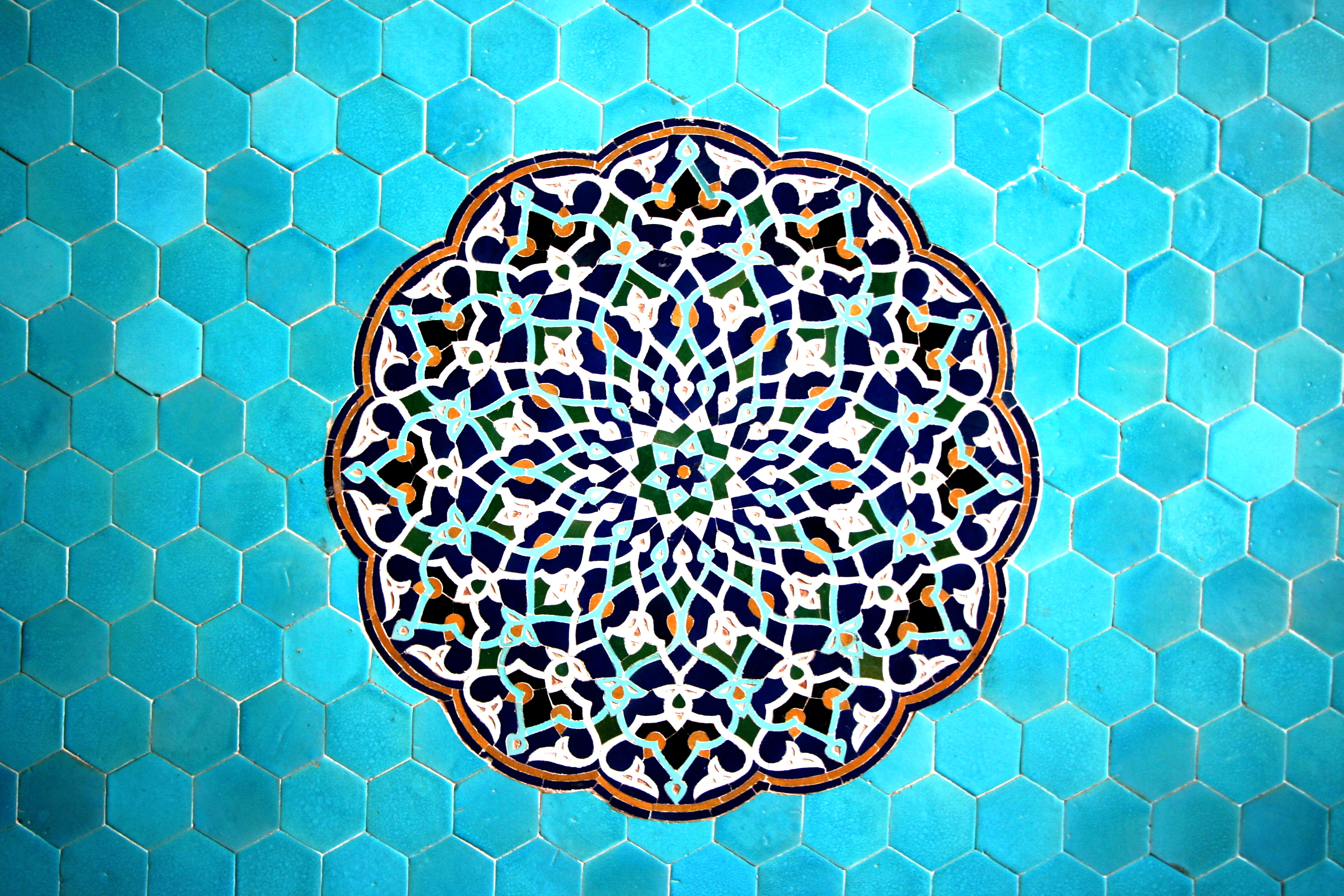
Tiles inside the Jame Mosque of Yazd, Persia, with geometric and vegetal patterns

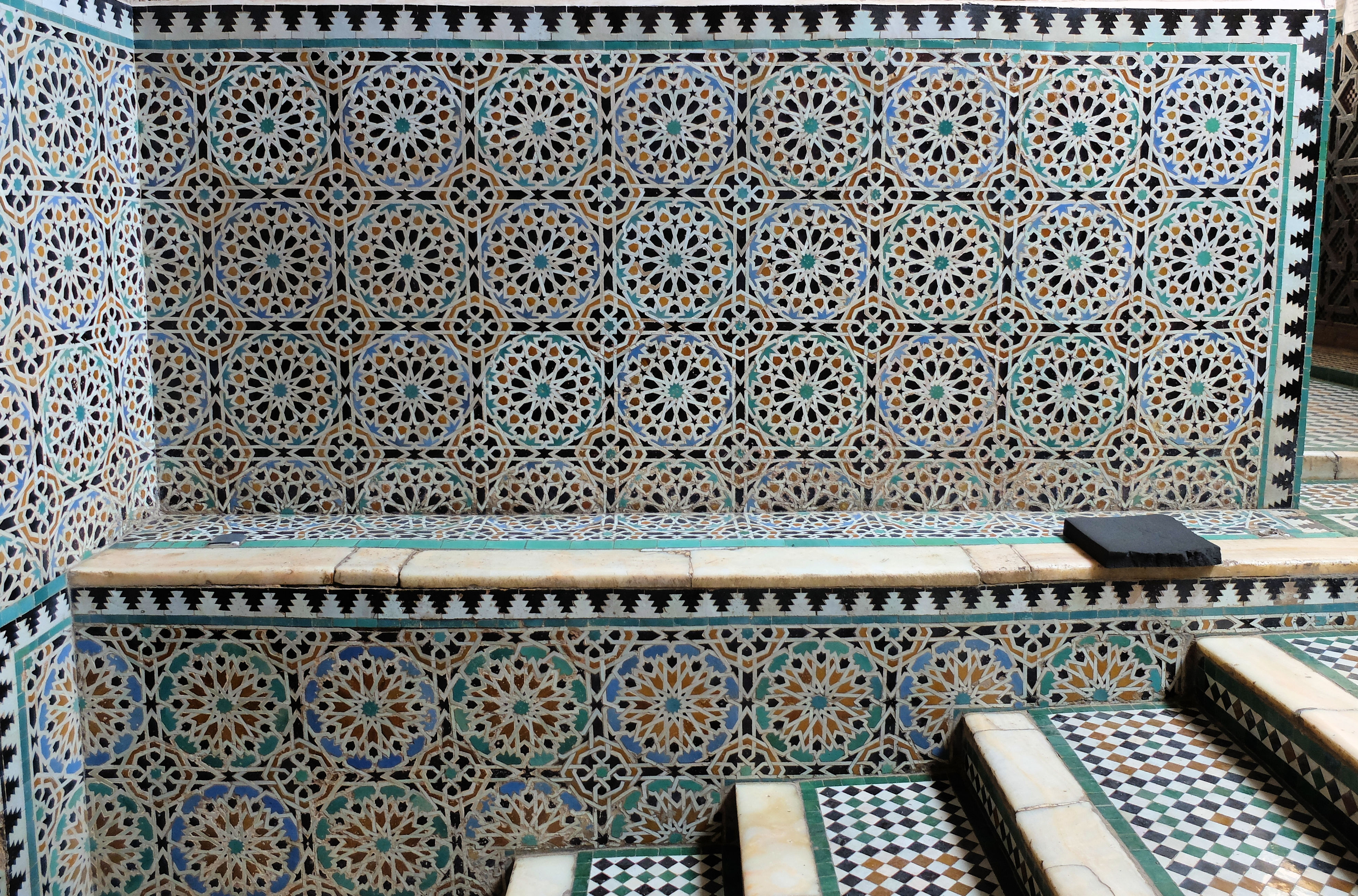
Bou Inania Madrasa, Fes, Morocco, originally c. 1350, with geometric patterns in zellij tilework

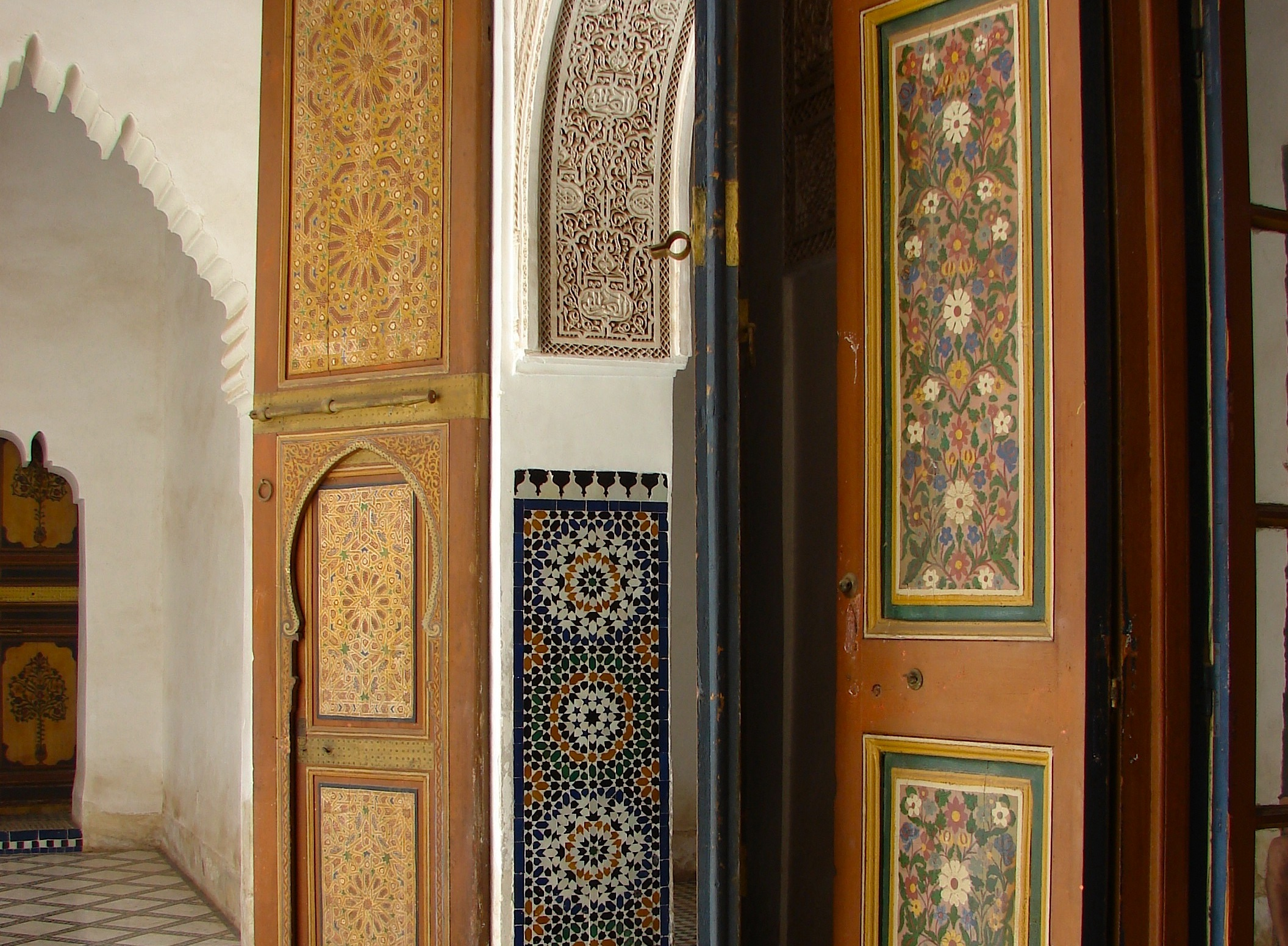
A variety of vernacular decorative Islamic styles in Morocco: wooden panels, zellij tilework, stucco calligraphy, and floral door panels

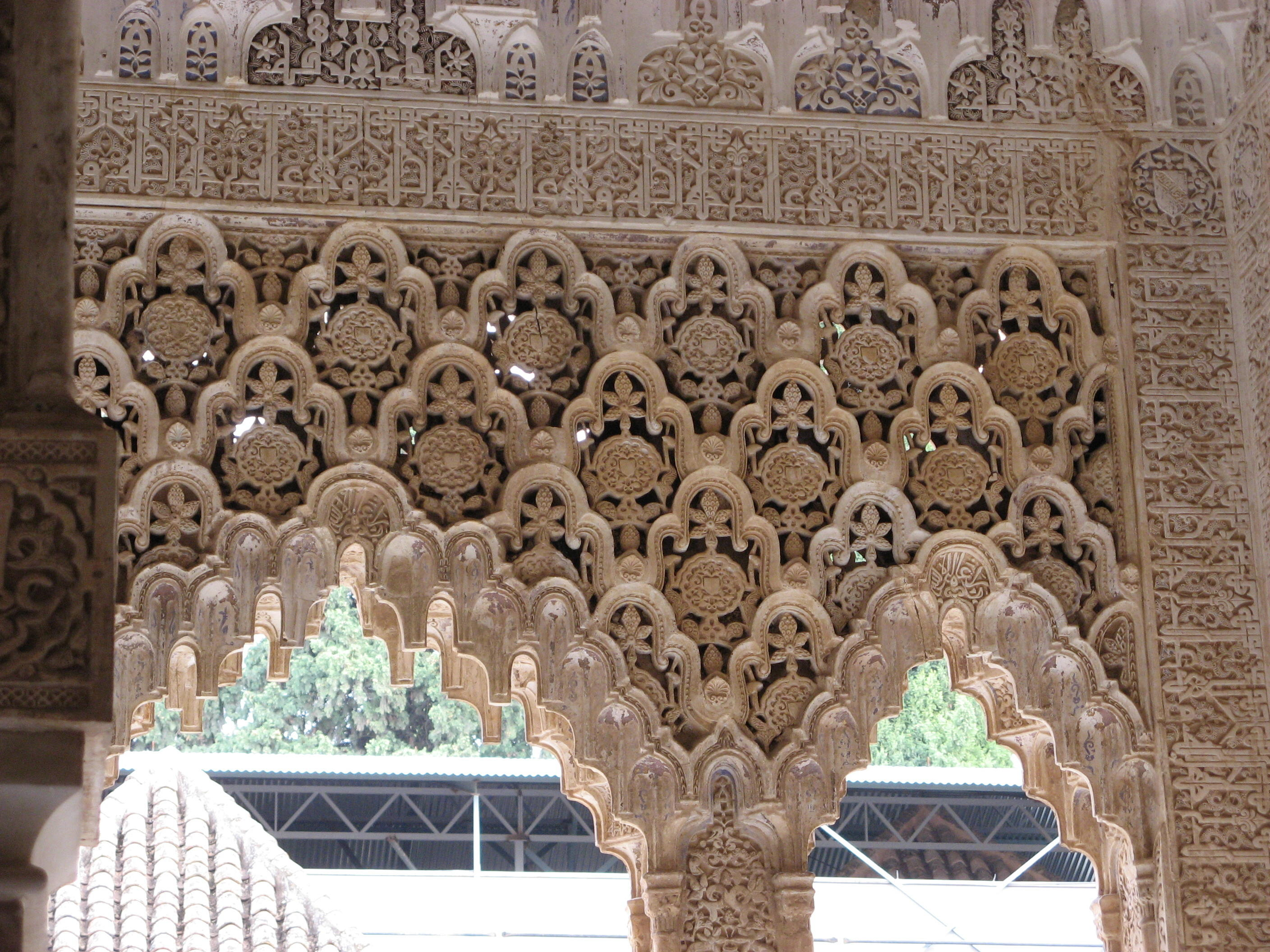
Arch in the Alhambra with Muqarnas (Mocárabe) stalactite work

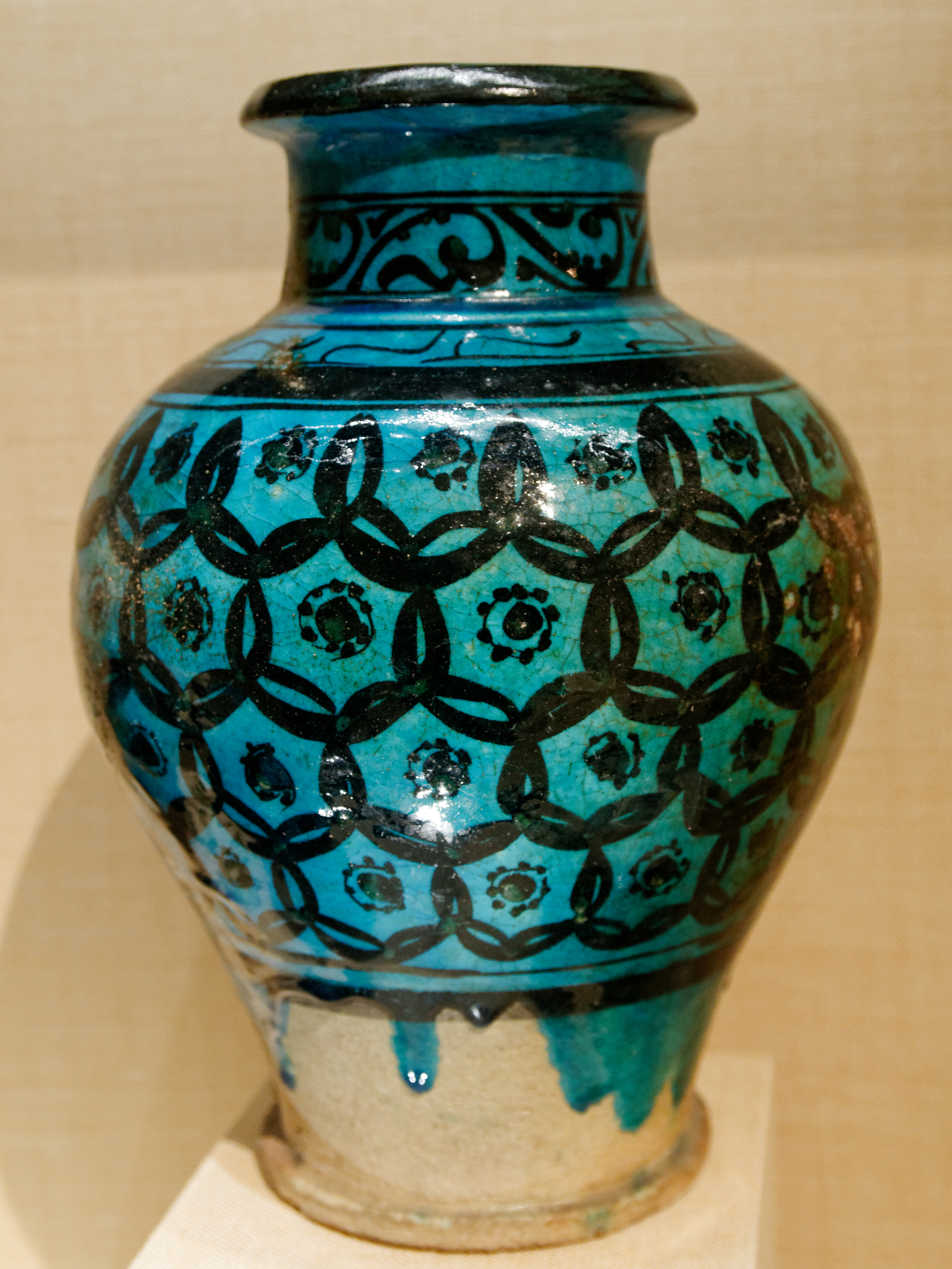
Ayyubid Raqqa ware stoneware glazed jar with overlapping circles grid pattern. Syria, 12th/13th century

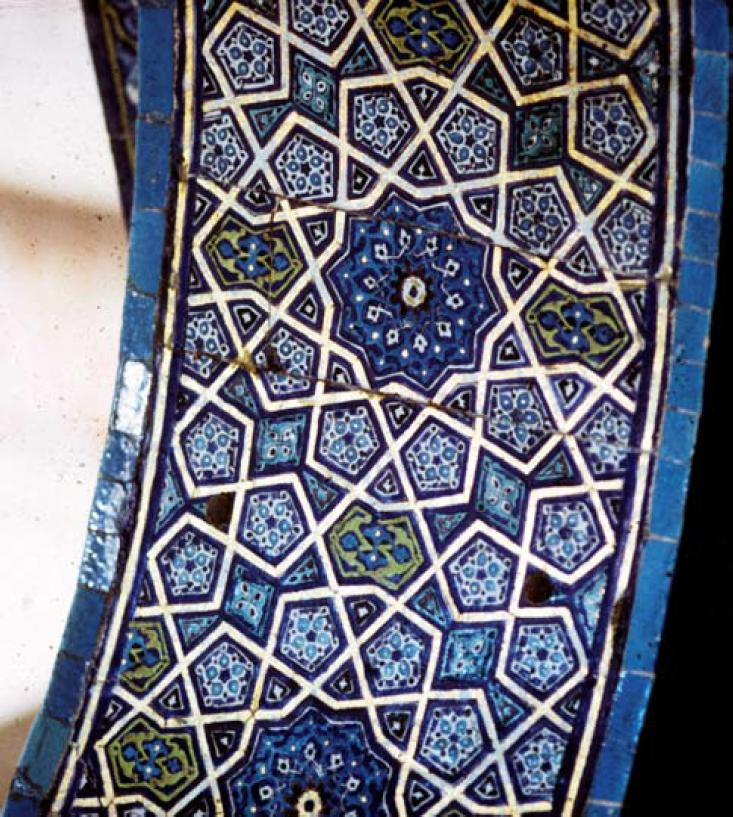
An archway in the Ottoman Green Mosque, Bursa, Turkey (1424), with girih 10-point stars and pentagons

== Pattern formation ==
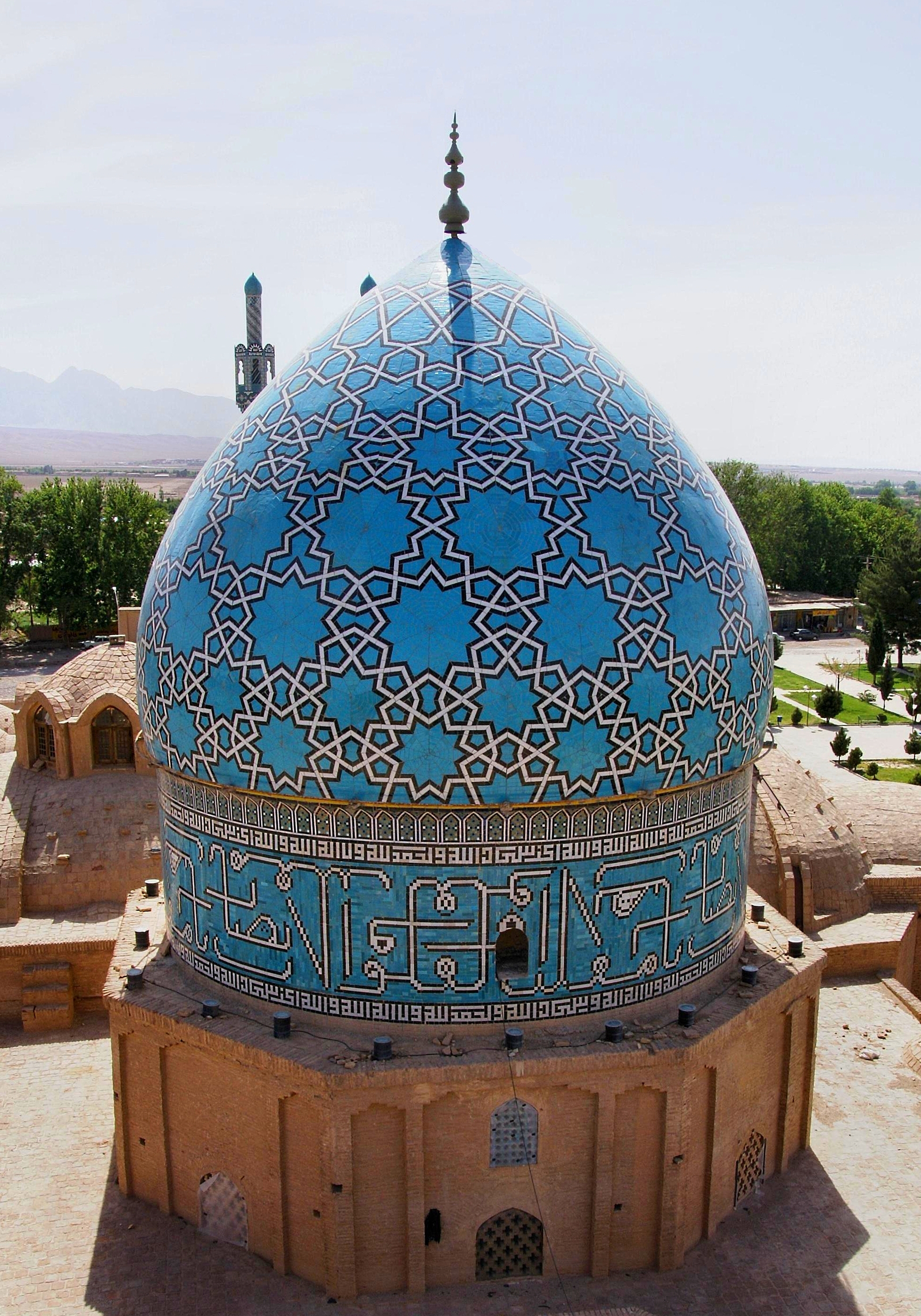
The Shah Nematollah Vali Shrine, Mahan, Iran, 1431. The blue girih-tiled dome contains stars with, from the top, 5, 7, 9, 12, 11, 9 and 10 points in turn. 11-point stars are rare in Islamic art.

Many Islamic designs are built on squares and circles, typically repeated, overlapped and interlaced to form intricate and complex patterns. A recurring motif is the 8-pointed star, often seen in Islamic tilework; it is made of two squares, one rotated 45 degrees with respect to the other. The fourth basic shape is the polygon, including pentagons and octagons. All of these can be combined and reworked to form complicated patterns with a variety of symmetries including reflections and rotations. Such patterns can be seen as mathematical tessellations, which can extend indefinitely and thus suggest infinity. They are constructed on grids that require only ruler and compass to draw. Artist and educator Roman Verostko argues that such constructions are in effect algorithms, making Islamic geometric patterns forerunners of modern algorithmic art.

The circle symbolizes unity and diversity in nature, and many Islamic patterns are drawn starting with a circle. For example, the decoration of the 15th-century mosque in Yazd, Persia is based on a circle, divided into six by six circles drawn around it, all touching at its centre and each touching its two neighbours' centres to form a regular hexagon. On this basis is constructed a six-pointed star surrounded by six smaller irregular hexagons to form a tessellating star pattern. This forms the basic design which is outlined in white on the wall of the mosque. That design, however, is overlaid with an intersecting tracery in blue around tiles of other colours, forming an elaborate pattern that partially conceals the original and underlying design. A similar design forms the logo of the Mohammed Ali Research Center.

One of the early Western students of Islamic patterns, Ernest Hanbury Hankin, defined a "geometrical arabesque" as a pattern formed "with the help of construction lines consisting of polygons in contact." He observed that many different combinations of polygons can be used as long as the residual spaces between the polygons are reasonably symmetrical. For example, a grid of octagons in contact has squares (of the same side as the octagons) as the residual spaces. Every octagon is the basis for an 8-point star, as seen at Akbar's tomb, Sikandra (1605–1613). Hankin considered the "skill of the Arabian artists in discovering suitable combinations of polygons .. almost astounding." He further records that if a star occurs in a corner, exactly one quarter of it should be shown; if along an edge, exactly one half of it.

The Topkapı Scroll, made in Timurid dynasty Iran in the late-15th century or beginning of the 16th century, contains 114 patterns including coloured designs for girih tilings and muqarnas quarter or semidomes.

The mathematical properties of the decorative tile and stucco patterns of the Alhambra palace in Granada, Spain have been extensively studied. Some authors have claimed on dubious grounds to have found most or all of the 17 wallpaper groups there. Moroccan geometric woodwork from the 14th to 19th centuries makes use of only 5 wallpaper groups, mainly p4mm and c2mm, with p6mm and p2mm occasionally and p4gm rarely; it is claimed that the "Hasba" (measure) method of construction, which starts with n-fold rosettes, can however generate all 17 groups.

Methods of construction

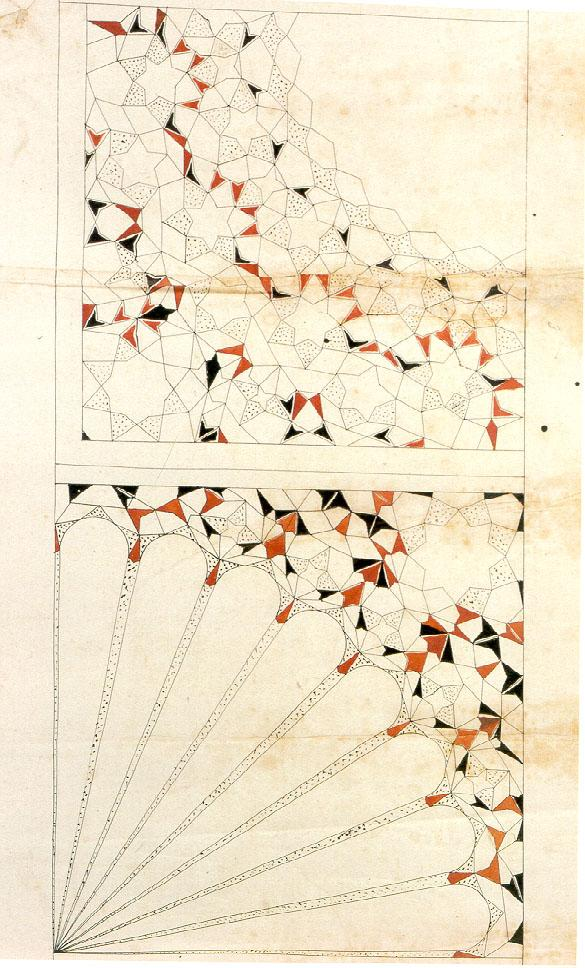
Two-dimensional designs for two quarter-dome muqarnas – as a seashell (top), as a fan (bottom). Topkapı Scroll, 15th century

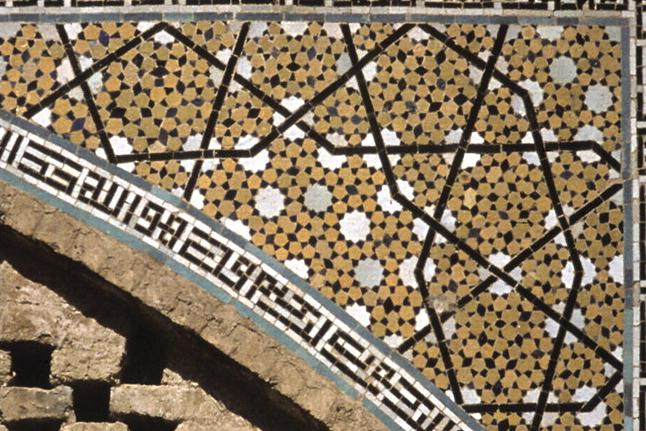
Girih tiling in the decagonal pattern on a spandrel from the Darb-e Imam shrine

Construction of girih pattern in Darb-e Imam spandrel (yellow line). Construction decagons blue, bowties red. The strapwork cuts across the construction tessellation.

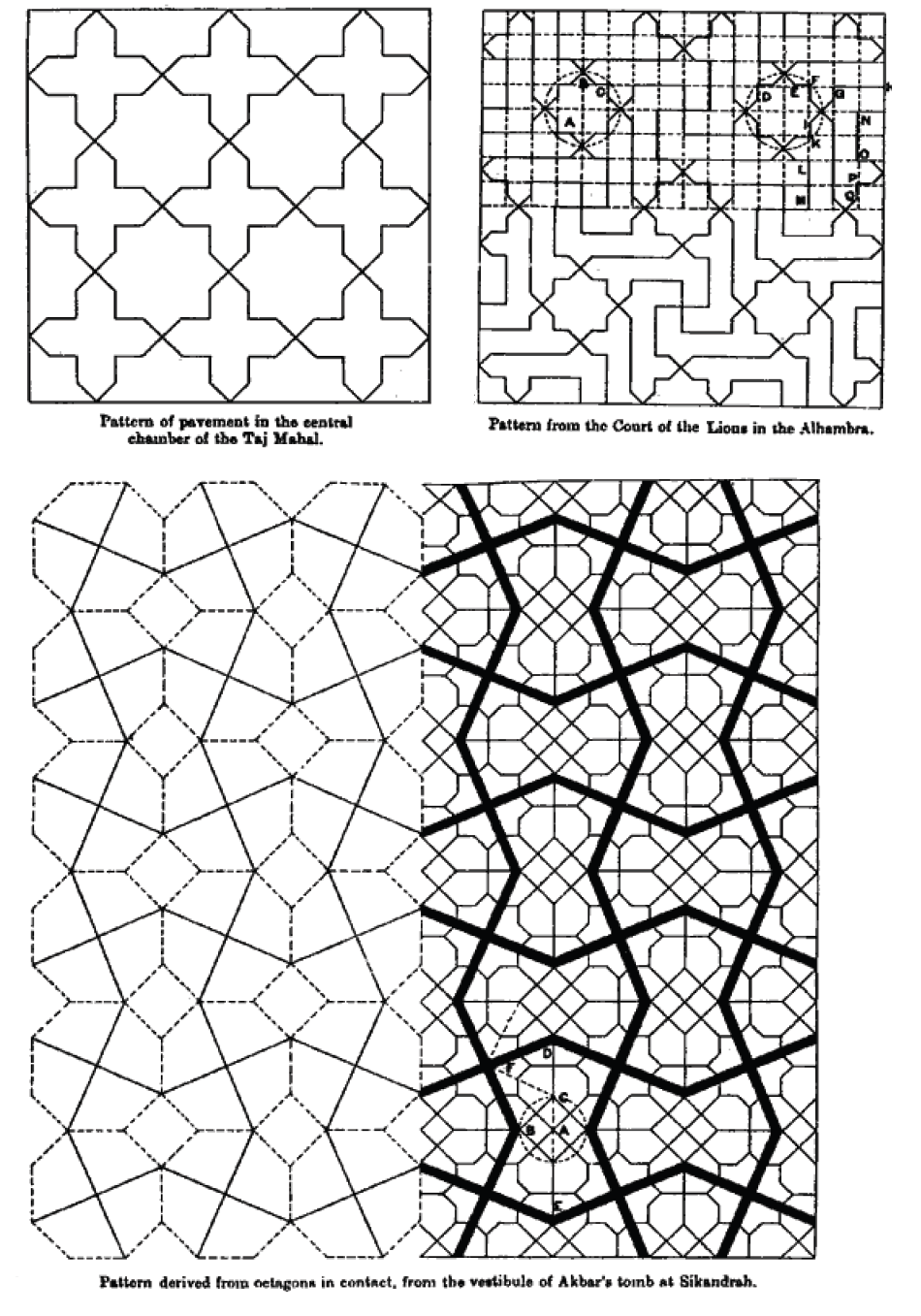
Analysis of octagonal patterns in Mughal architecture by Ernest Hanbury Hankin, 1925. 8-pointed stars emerge (lower right) where heavy black lines cross.

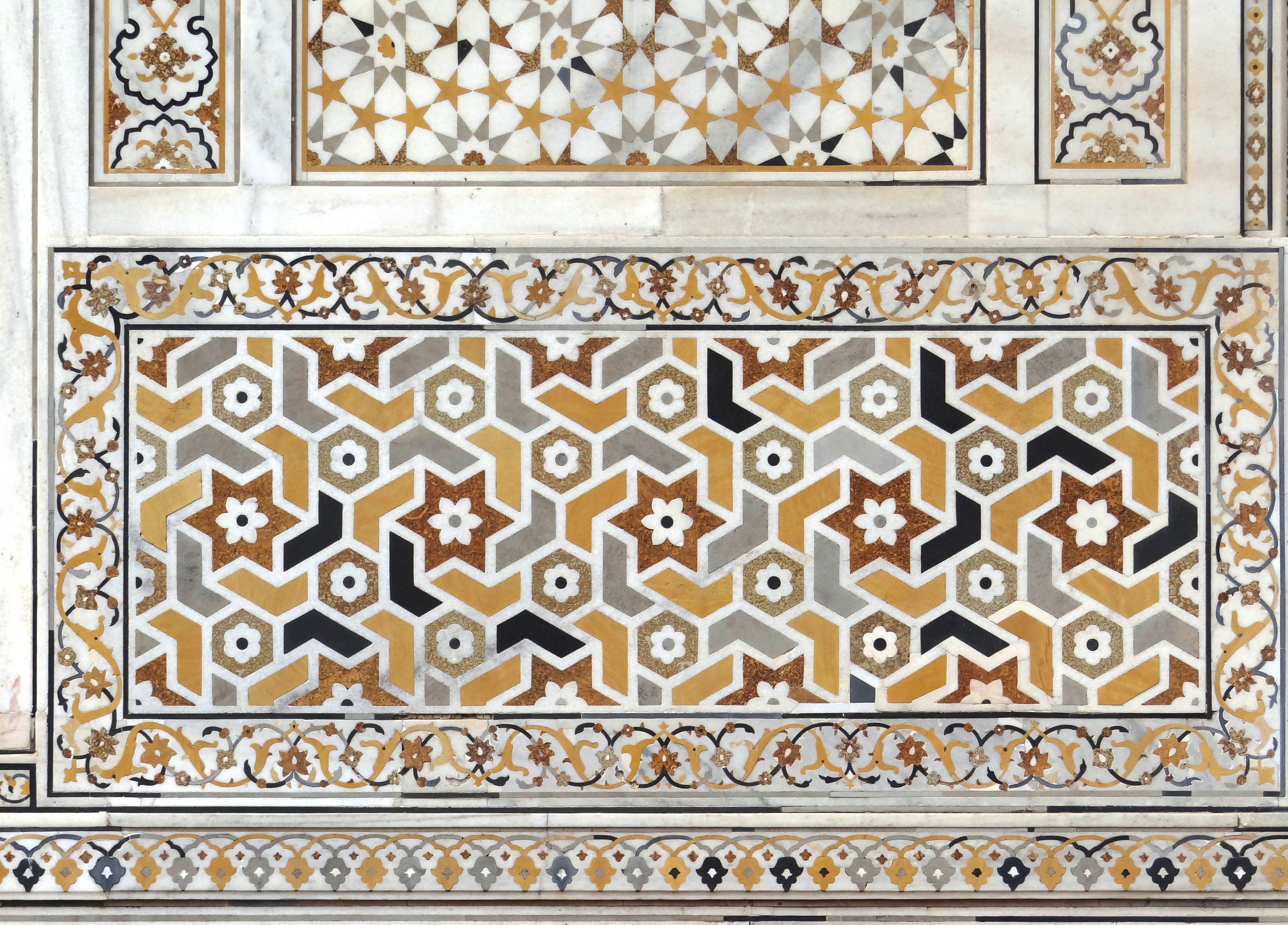
Decoration in Tomb of I'timād-ud-Daulah, Agra, showing correct treatment of sides and corners. A quarter of each 6-point star is shown in each corner; half stars along the sides.

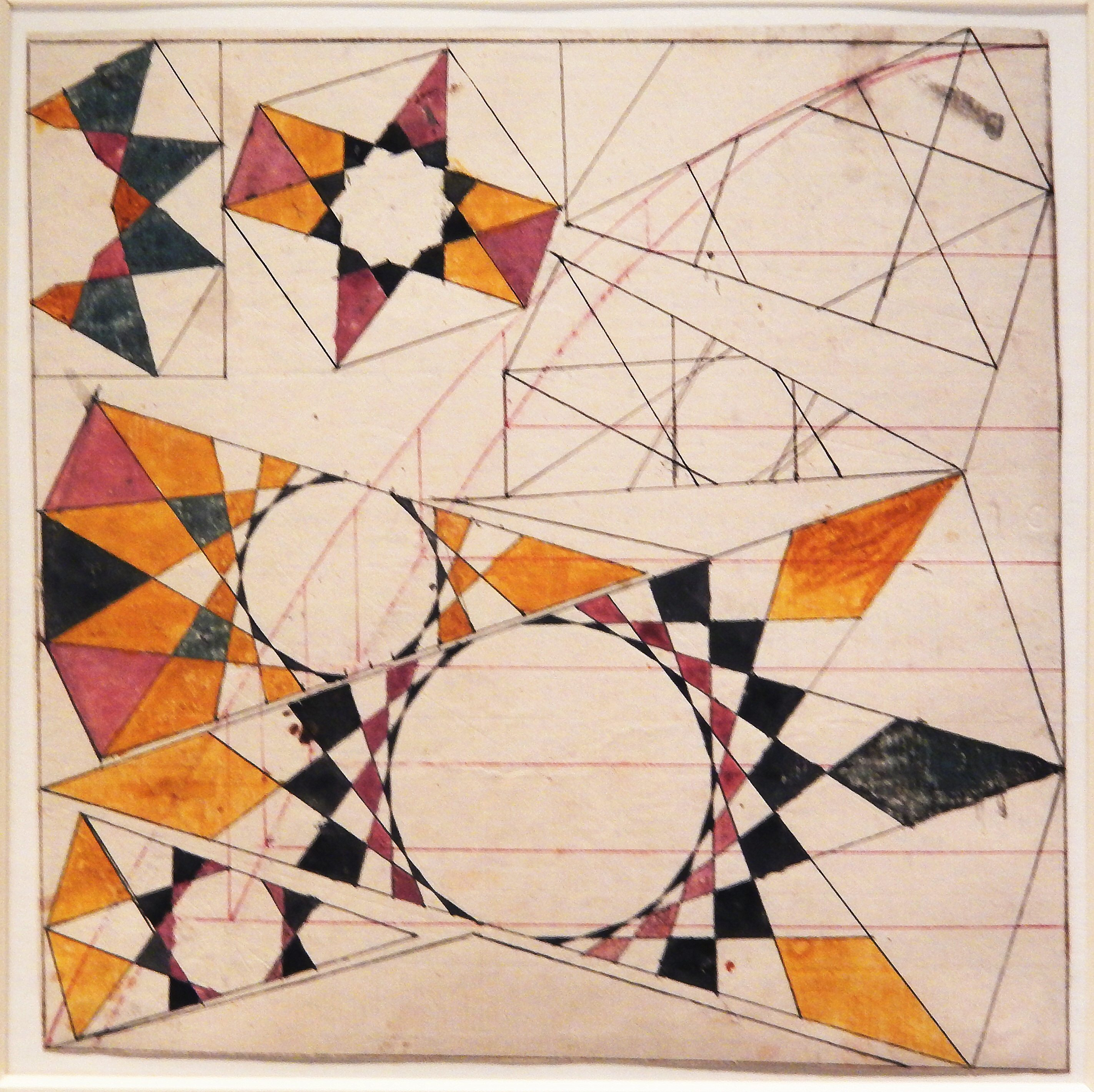
Architectural drawing for brick vaulting, Iran, probably Tehran, 1800–70

== Evolution ==
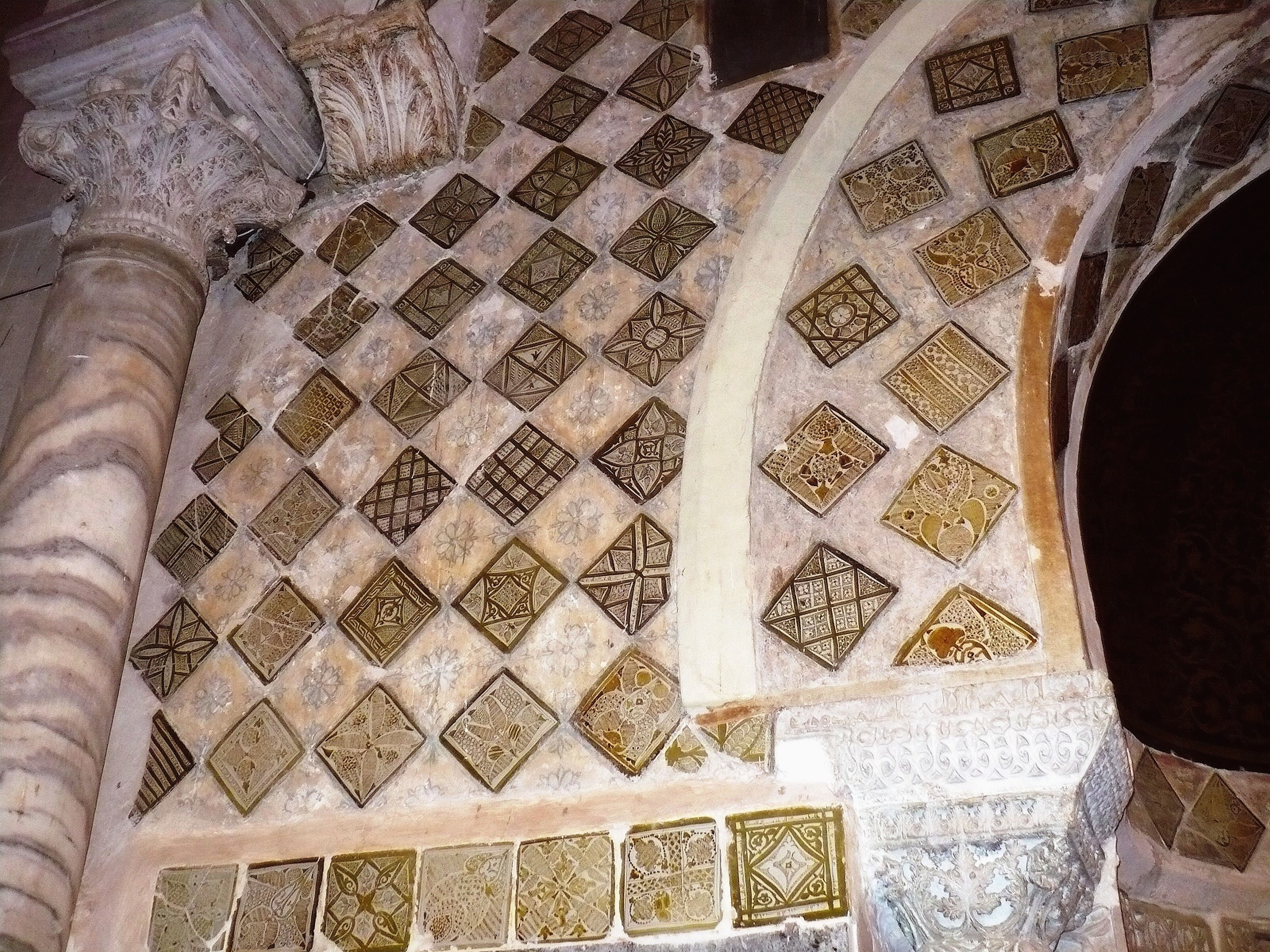
Early stage: simple geometric patterns on lustre tiles in the Great Mosque of Kairouan, Tunisia. 836 onwards

=== Early stage ===
The earliest geometrical forms in Islamic art were occasional isolated geometric shapes such as 8-pointed stars and lozenges containing squares. These date from 836 in the Great Mosque of Kairouan, Tunisia, and since then have spread all across the Islamic world.

=== Middle stage ===
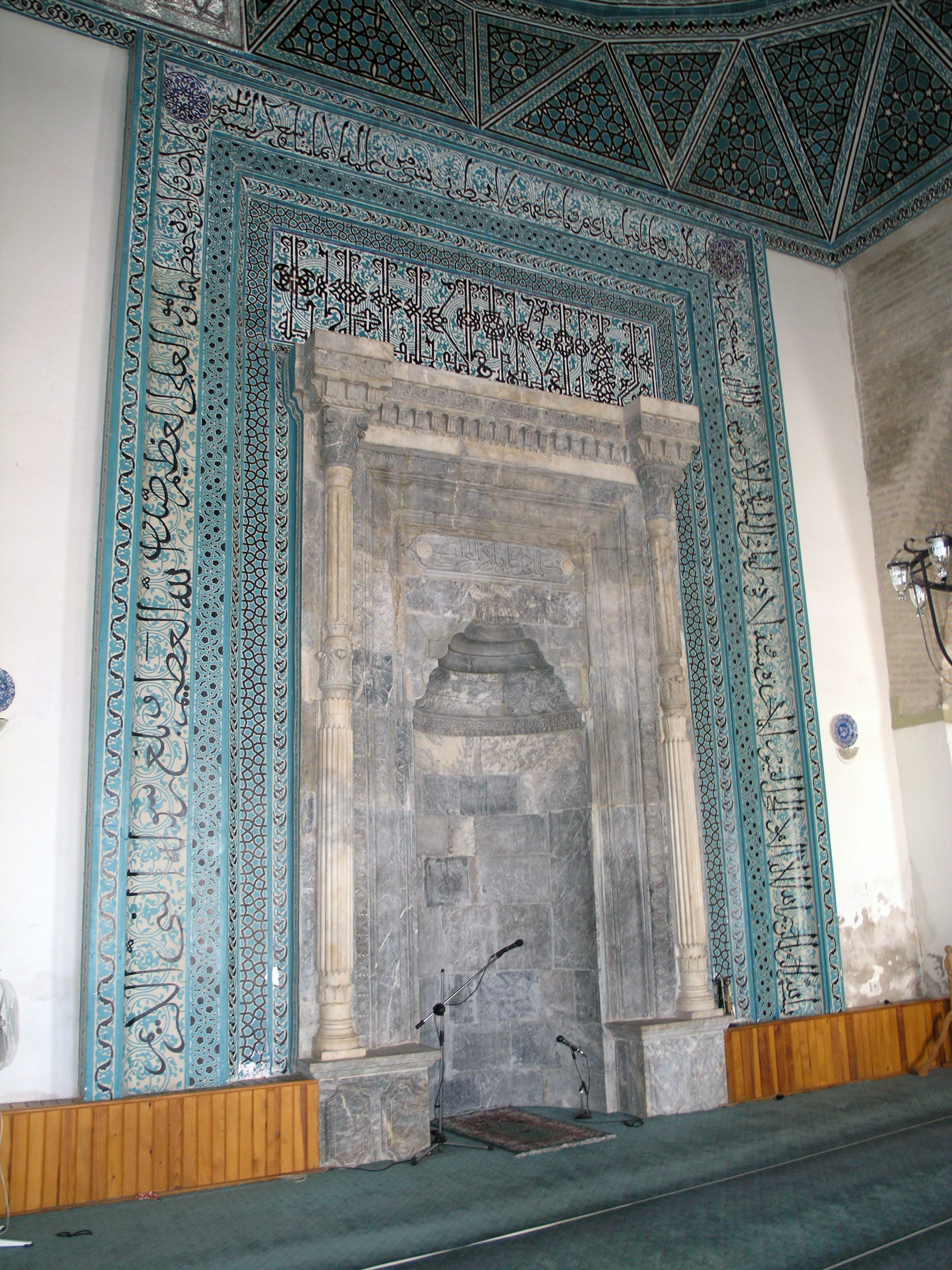
Middle stage patterns on geometric borders around a Mihrab in the Alâeddin Mosque, Konya, Turkey. 1220 onwards

The next development, marking the middle stage of Islamic geometric pattern usage, was of 6- and 8-point stars, which appear in 879 at the Ibn Tulun Mosque, Cairo, and then became widespread.

A wider variety of patterns were used from the 11th century. Abstract 6- and 8-point shapes appear in the Tower of Kharaqan at Qazvin, Persia in 1067, and the Al-Juyushi Mosque, Egypt in 1085, again becoming widespread from there, though 6-point patterns are rare in Turkey.

In 1086, 7- and 10-point girih patterns (with heptagons, 5- and 6-pointed stars, triangles and irregular hexagons) appear in the Jameh Mosque of Isfahan. 10-point girih became widespread in the Islamic world, except in the Spanish Al-Andalus. Soon afterwards, sweeping 9-, 11-, and 13-point girih patterns were used in the Barsian Mosque, also in Persia, in 1098; these, like 7-point geometrical patterns, are rarely used outside Persia and central Asia.

Finally, marking the end of the middle stage, 8- and 12-point girih rosette patterns appear in the Alâeddin Mosque at Konya, Turkey in 1220, and in the Abbasid palace in Baghdad in 1230, going on to become widespread across the Islamic world.

=== Late stage ===
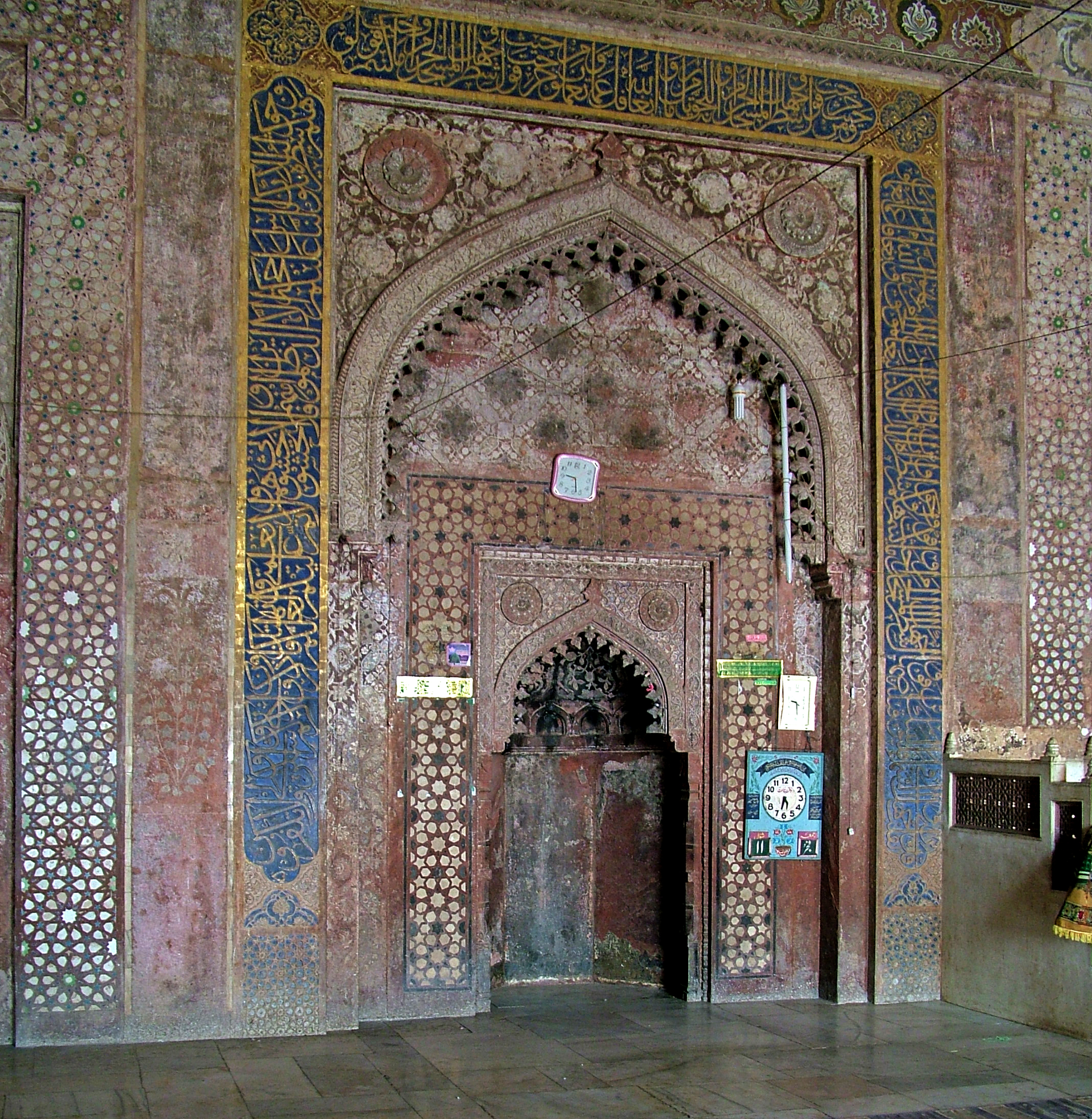
Late stage: geometric, vegetal, and calligraphic patterns around the Mihrab at the Jama Masjid, Fatehpur Sikri. 1571-5

The beginning of the late stage is marked by the use of simple 16-point patterns at the Hasan Sadaqah mausoleum in Cairo in 1321, and in the Alhambra in Spain in 1338–1390. These patterns are rarely found outside these two regions. More elaborate combined 16-point geometrical patterns are found in the Sultan Hassan complex in Cairo in 1363, but rarely elsewhere. Finally, 14-point patterns appear in the Jama Masjid at Fatehpur Sikri in India in 1571–1596, but in few other places. (Note: One such place is the Mustansiriyya Madrasa in Baghdad, as illustrated by Broug.)

== Artforms ==
Several artforms in different parts of the Islamic world make use of geometric patterns. These include ceramics, girih strapwork, jali pierced stone screens, kilim rugs, leather, metalwork, muqarnas vaulting, shakaba stained glass, woodwork, and zellij tiling.

=== Ceramics ===
Ceramics lend themselves to circular motifs, whether radial or tangential. Bowls or plates can be decorated inside or out with radial stripes; these may be partly figurative, representing stylised leaves or flower petals, while circular bands can run around a bowl or jug. Patterns of these types were employed on Islamic ceramics from the Ayyubid period, 13th century. Radially symmetric flowers with, say, 6 petals lend themselves to increasingly stylised geometric designs which can combine geometric simplicity with recognisably naturalistic motifs, brightly coloured glazes, and a radial composition that ideally suits circular crockery. Potters often chose patterns suited to the shape of the vessel they were making. Thus an unglazed earthenware water flask (Note: Leaving the flask porous allowed evaporation, keeping the water cool.) from Aleppo in the shape of a vertical circle (with handles and neck above) is decorated with a ring of moulded braiding around an Arabic inscription with a small 8-petalled flower at the centre.

=== Girih tilings and woodwork ===
Girih are elaborate interlacing patterns formed of five standardized shapes. The style is used in Persian Islamic architecture and also in decorative woodwork. Girih designs are traditionally made in different media including cut brickwork, stucco, and mosaic faience tilework. In woodwork, especially in the Safavid period, it could be applied either as lattice frames, left plain or inset with panels such as of coloured glass; or as mosaic panels used to decorate walls and ceilings, whether sacred or secular. In architecture, girih forms decorative interlaced strapwork surfaces from the 15th century to the 20th century. Most designs are based on a partially hidden geometric grid which provides a regular array of points; this is made into a pattern using 2-, 3-, 4-, and 6-fold rotational symmetries which can fill the plane. The visible pattern superimposed on the grid is also geometric, with 6-, 8-, 10- and 12-pointed stars and a variety of convex polygons, joined by straps which typically seem to weave over and under each other. The visible pattern does not coincide with the underlying construction lines of the tiling. The visible patterns and the underlying tiling represent a bridge linking the invisible to the visible, analogous to the "epistemological quest" in Islamic culture, the search for the nature of knowledge.

=== Jali ===
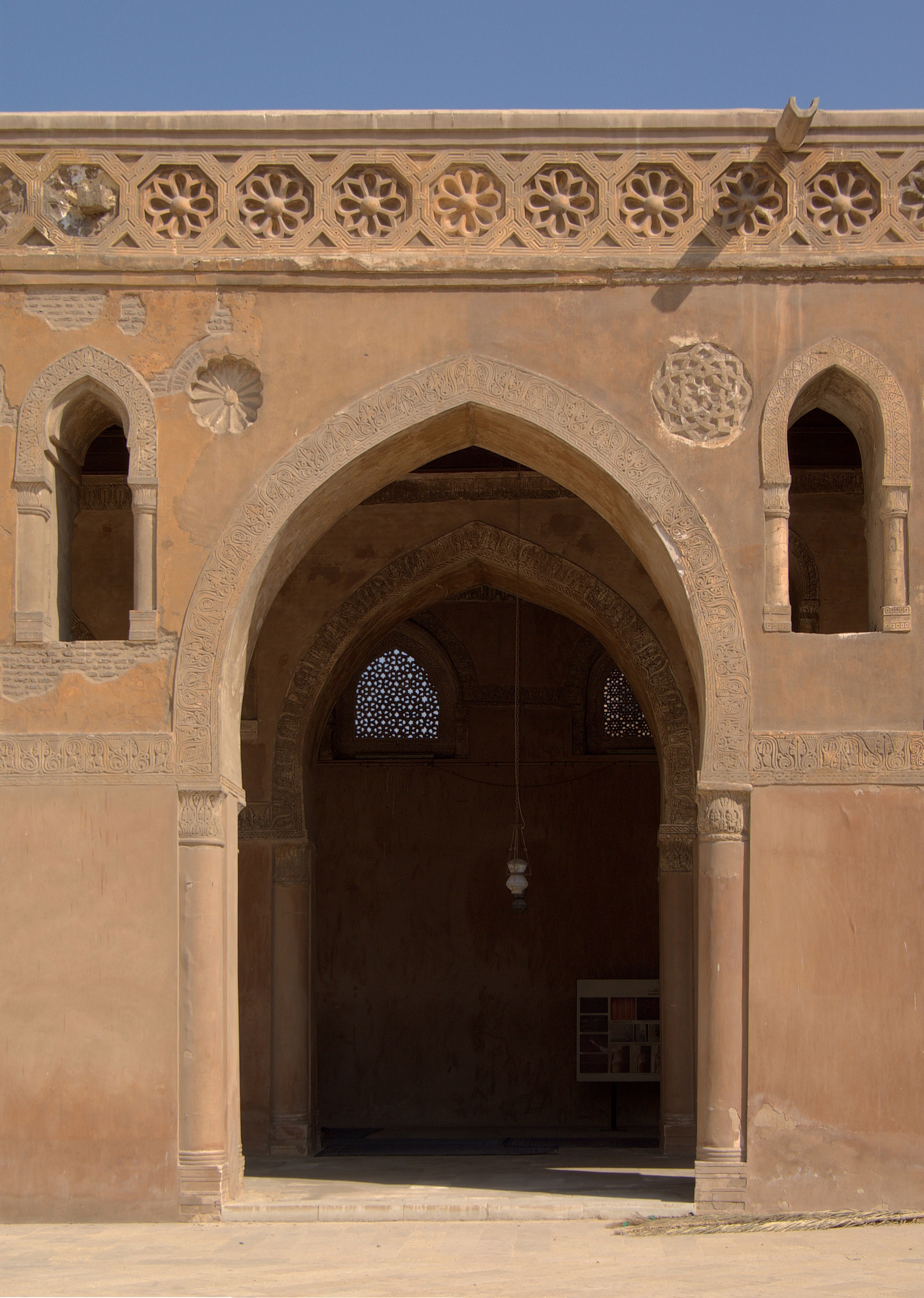
Mosque of Ibn Tulun: window with girih-style 10-point stars (at rear), with floral roundels in octagons forming a frieze at front

Jali are pierced stone screens with regularly repeating patterns. They are characteristic of Indo-Islamic architecture, for example in the Mughal dynasty buildings at Fatehpur Sikri and the Taj Mahal. The geometric designs combine polygons such as octagons and pentagons with other shapes such as 5- and 8-pointed stars. The patterns emphasized symmetries and suggested infinity by repetition. Jali functioned as windows or room dividers, providing privacy but allowing in air and light. Jali forms a prominent element of the architecture of India. The use of perforated walls has declined with modern building standards and the need for security. Modern, simplified jali walls, for example made with pre-moulded clay or cement blocks, have been popularised by the architect Laurie Baker. Pierced windows in girih style are sometimes found elsewhere in the Islamic world, such as in windows of the Mosque of Ibn Tulun in Cairo.

=== Kilim ===
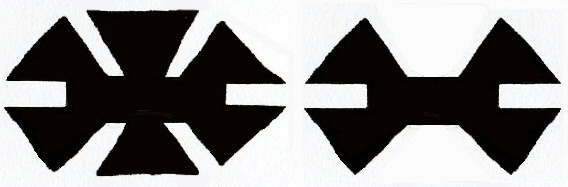
Somewhat geometric motifs such as the Wolf's Mouth (Kurt Aǧzi), to protect the flocks against wolves, are often woven into tribal kilims.

A kilim is an Islamic flatwoven carpet (without a pile), whether for household use or a prayer mat. The pattern is made by winding the weft threads back over the warp threads when a colour boundary is reached. This technique leaves a gap or vertical slit, so kilims are sometimes called slit-woven textiles. Kilims are often decorated with geometric patterns with 2- or 4-fold mirror or rotational symmetries. Because weaving uses vertical and horizontal threads, curves are difficult to generate, and patterns are accordingly formed mainly with straight edges. Kilim patterns are often characteristic of specific regions. Kilim motifs are often symbolic as well as decorative. For example, the wolf's mouth or wolf's foot motif (Turkish: Kurt Aǧzi, Kurt İzi) expresses the tribal weavers' desires for protection of their families' flocks from wolves.

=== Leather ===
Islamic leather is often embossed with patterns similar to those already described. Leather book covers, starting with the Quran where figurative artwork was excluded, were decorated with a combination of kufic script, medallions and geometric patterns, typically bordered by geometric braiding.

=== Metalwork ===
Metal artefacts share the same geometric designs that are used in other forms of Islamic art. However, in the view of Hamilton Gibb, the emphasis differs: geometric patterns tend to be used for borders, and if they are in the main decorative area they are most often used in combination with other motifs such as floral designs, arabesques, animal motifs, or calligraphic script. Geometric designs in Islamic metalwork can form a grid decorated with these other motifs, or they can form the background pattern.

Even where metal objects such as bowls and dishes do not seem to have geometric decoration, still the designs, such as arabesques, are often set in octagonal compartments or arranged in concentric bands around the object. Both closed designs (which do not repeat) and open or repetitive patterns are used. Patterns such as interlaced six-pointed stars were especially popular from the 12th century. Eva Baer notes that while this design was essentially simple, it was elaborated by metalworkers into intricate patterns interlaced with arabesques, sometimes organised around further basic Islamic patterns, such as the hexagonal pattern of six overlapping circles.

=== Muqarnas ===
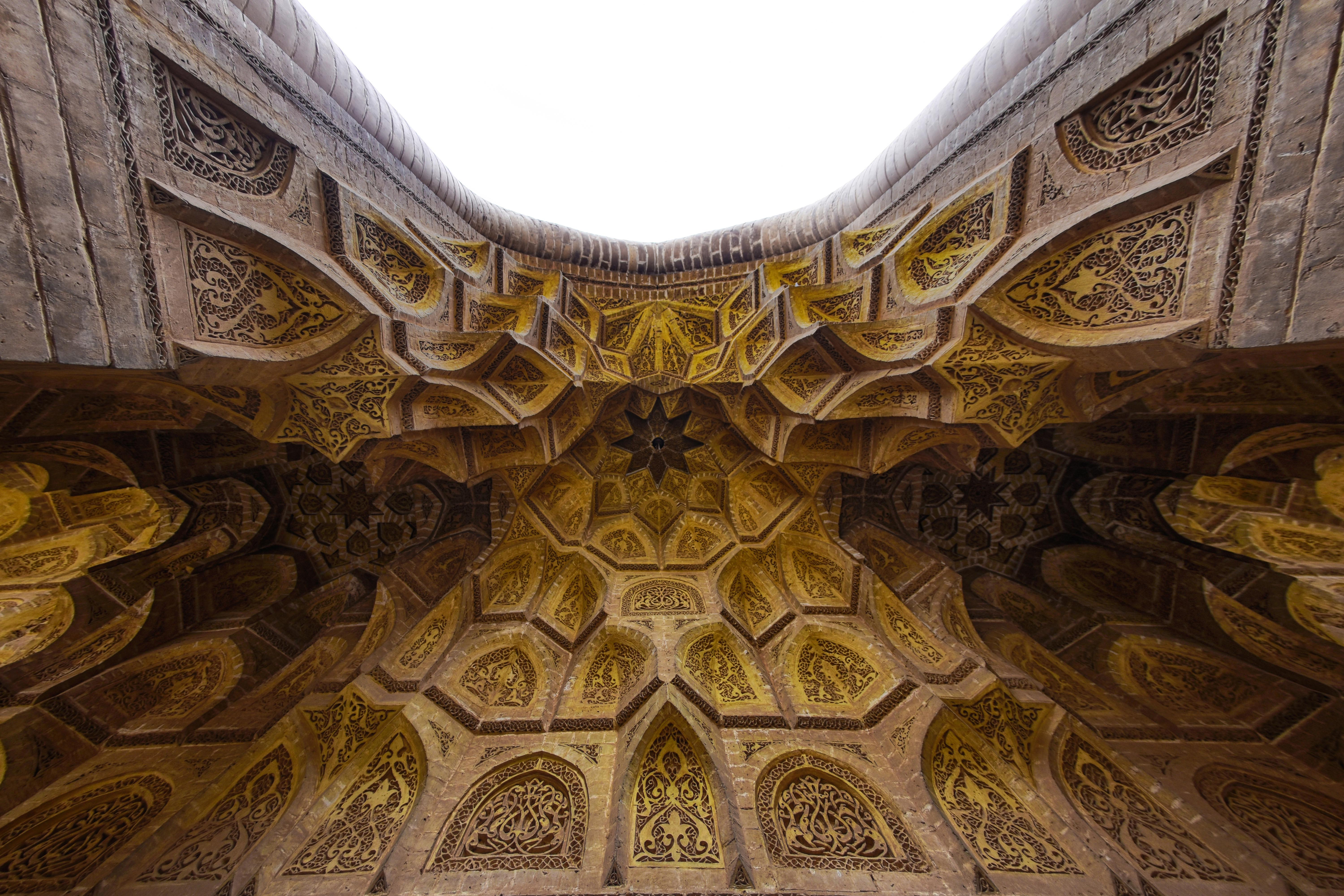
Muqarnas with carved patterns in the Abbasid Palace, Baghdad, Iraq

Muqarnas are elaborately carved ceilings to semi-domes, often used in mosques. They are typically made of stucco (and thus do not have a structural function), but can also be of wood, brick, and stone. They are characteristic of Islamic architecture of the Middle Ages from Spain and Morocco in the west to Persia in the east. Architecturally they form multiple tiers of squinches, diminishing in size as they rise. They are often elaborately decorated.

=== Stained glass ===
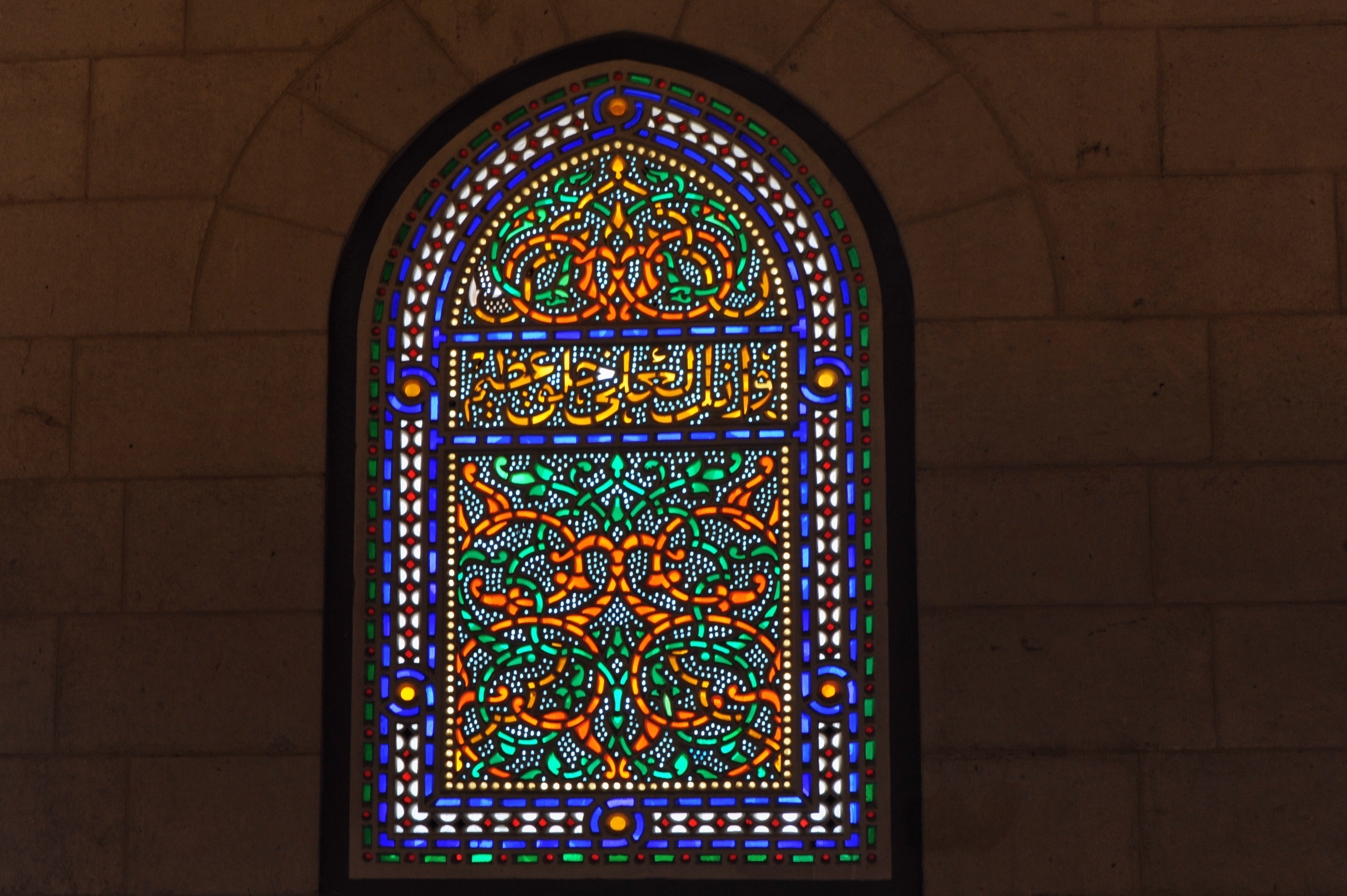
Stained glass window in Qibli (Al-Aqsa) Mosque, Jerusalem

Geometrically patterned stained glass is used in a variety of settings in Islamic architecture. It is found in the surviving summer residence of the Palace of Shaki Khans, Azerbaijan, constructed in 1797. Patterns in the "shabaka" windows include 6-, 8-, and 12-point stars. These wood-framed decorative windows are distinctive features of the palace's architecture. Shabaka are still constructed the traditional way in Sheki in the 21st century. Traditions of stained glass set in wooden frames (not lead as in Europe) survive in workshops in Iran as well as Azerbaijan. Glazed windows set in stucco arranged in girih-like patterns are found both in Turkey and the Arab lands; a late example, without the traditional balance of design elements, was made in Tunisia for the International Colonial Exhibition in Amsterdam in 1883. The old city of Sana'a in Yemen has stained glass windows in its tall buildings.

The stained-glass technique developed after the 12th century originated in Syria, first in Raqqa and later in Damascus. This method introduced a new approach to decorating glass, in which enamel paints were applied to the surface and then refired to permanently fuse the colours to the glass. The glass was subsequently cut into individual shapes and assembled within a leaded window. This differed from the earlier technique, which relied on producing each coloured piece of glass separately before cutting and shaping the pieces into complex forms.

=== Zellij ===
Zellij (Arabic: الزَّلِيْج) is geometric tilework with glazed terracotta tiles set into plaster, forming colourful mosaic patterns including regular and semiregular tessellations. The tradition is characteristic of Morocco, but is also found in Moorish Spain. Zellij is used to decorate mosques, public buildings and wealthy private houses.

=== Illustrations ===
Media used for Islamic geometric patterns

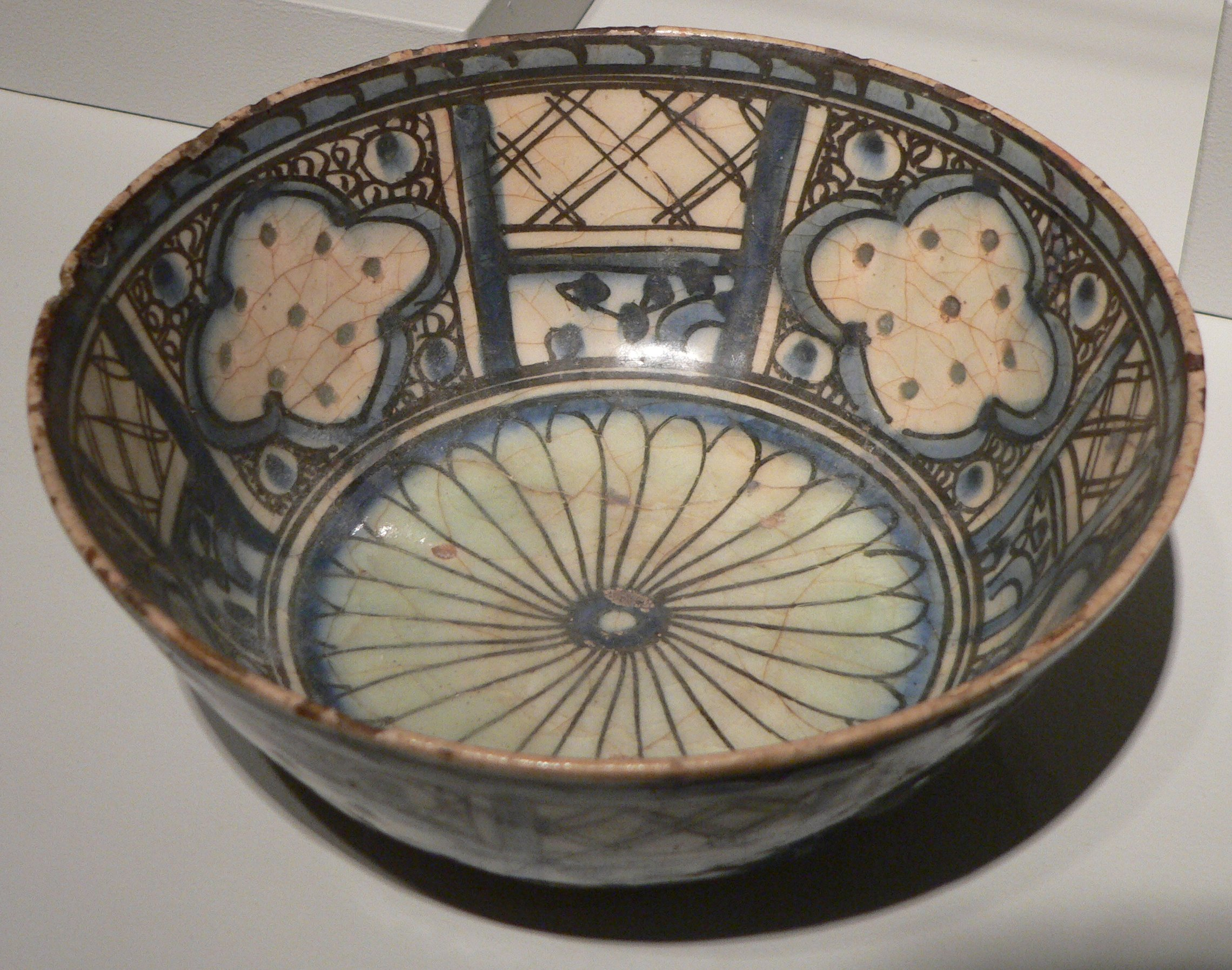
Safavid bowl with radial and circular motifs, Persia, 17th century

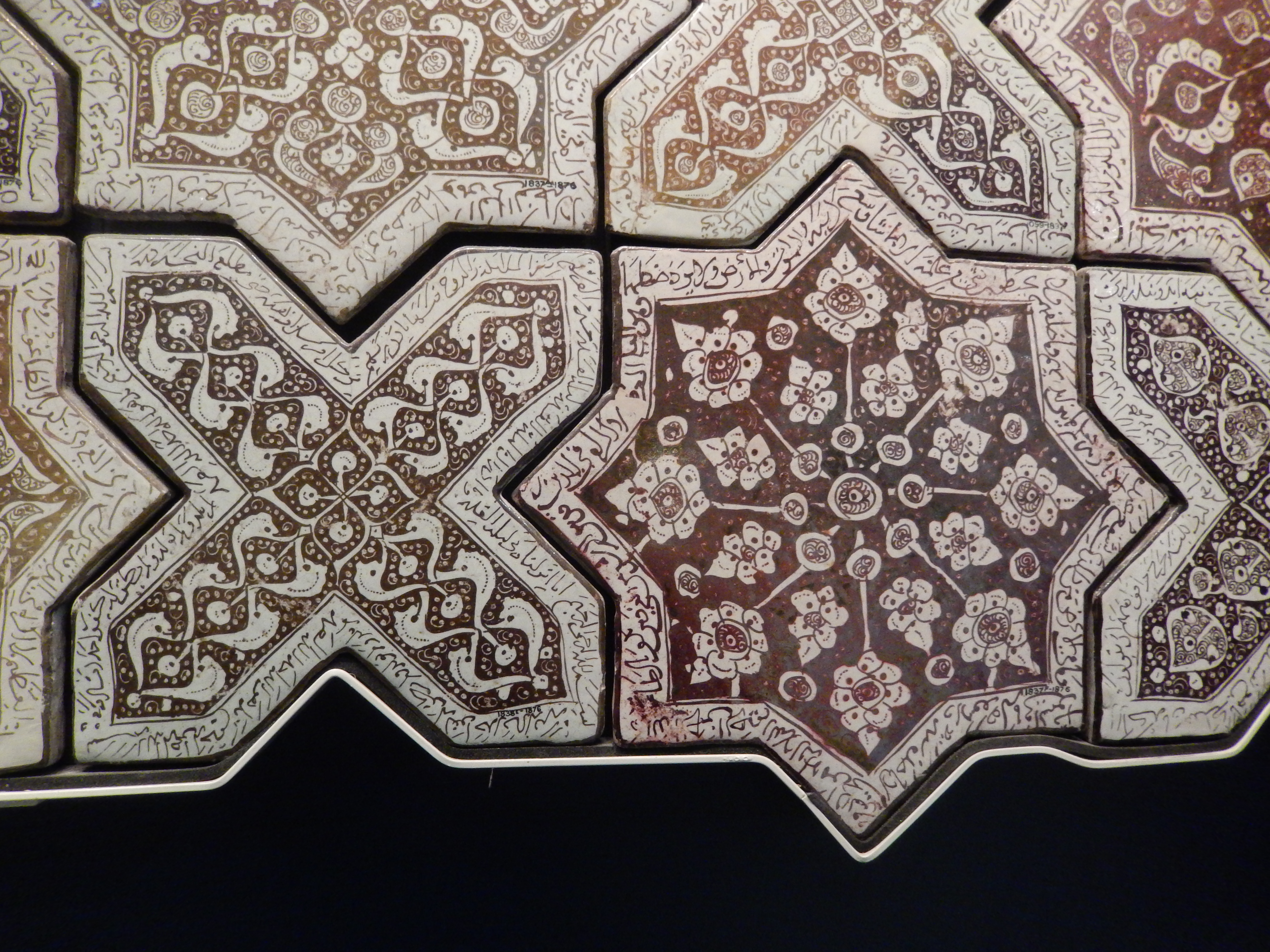
Lustre tiles from Iran, probably Kashan, 1262, in the shapes of the Sufi symbols for the divine breath

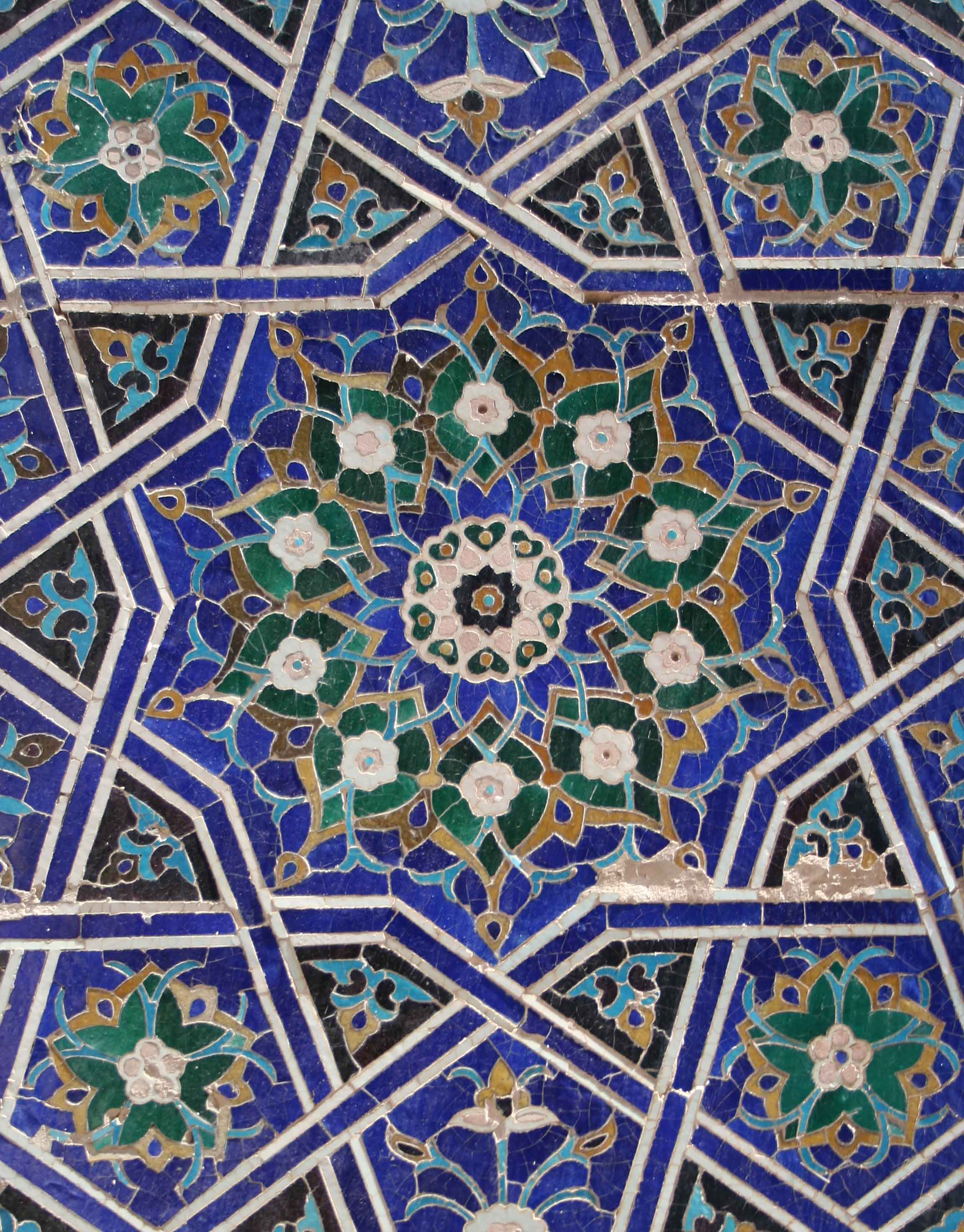
Glazed tilework Girih at Shah-i-Zinda in Samarkand, Uzbekistan

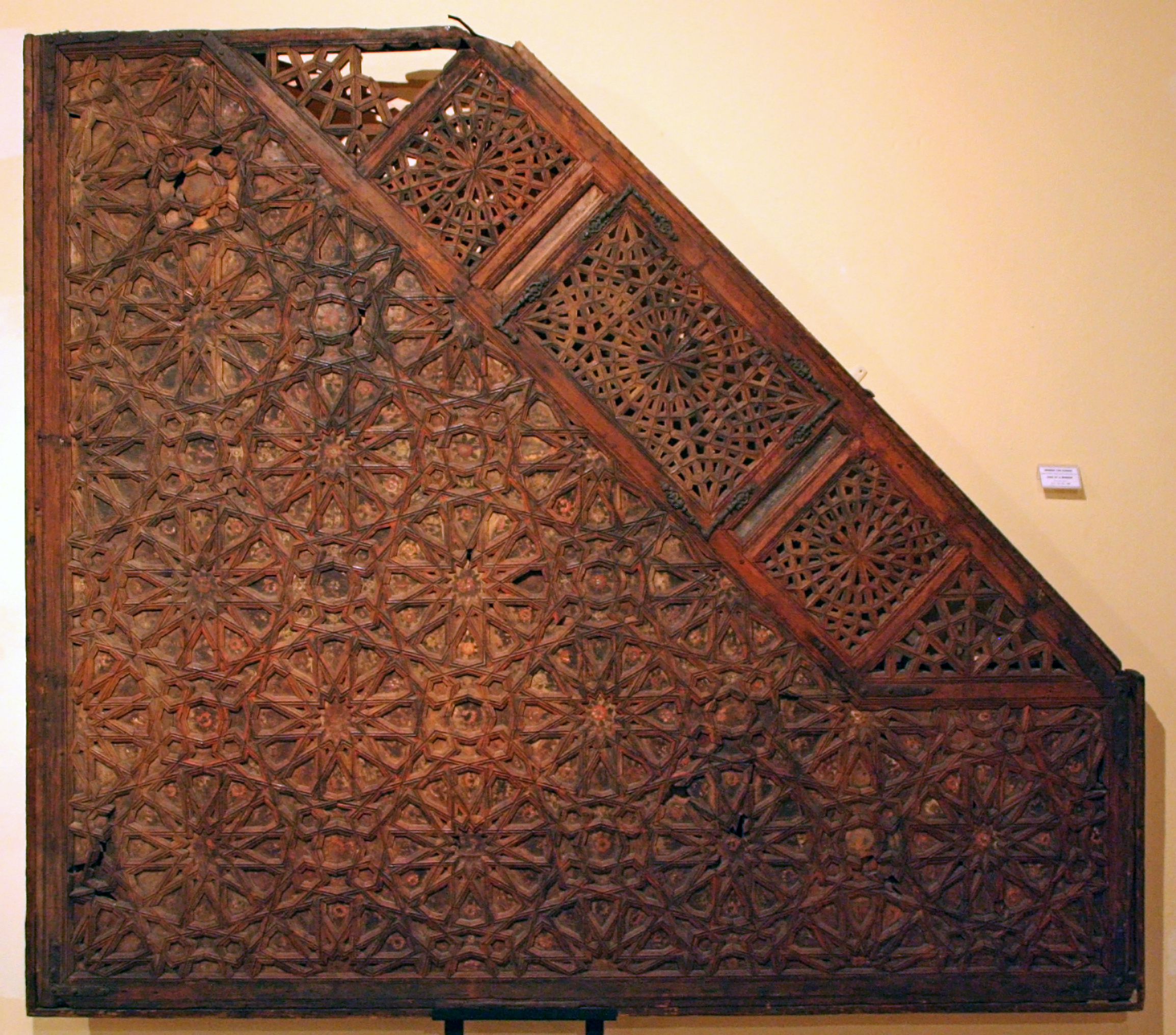
Side of a wooden Minbar (pulpit) with 12-point stars. 14th century. Turkish and Islamic Arts Museum

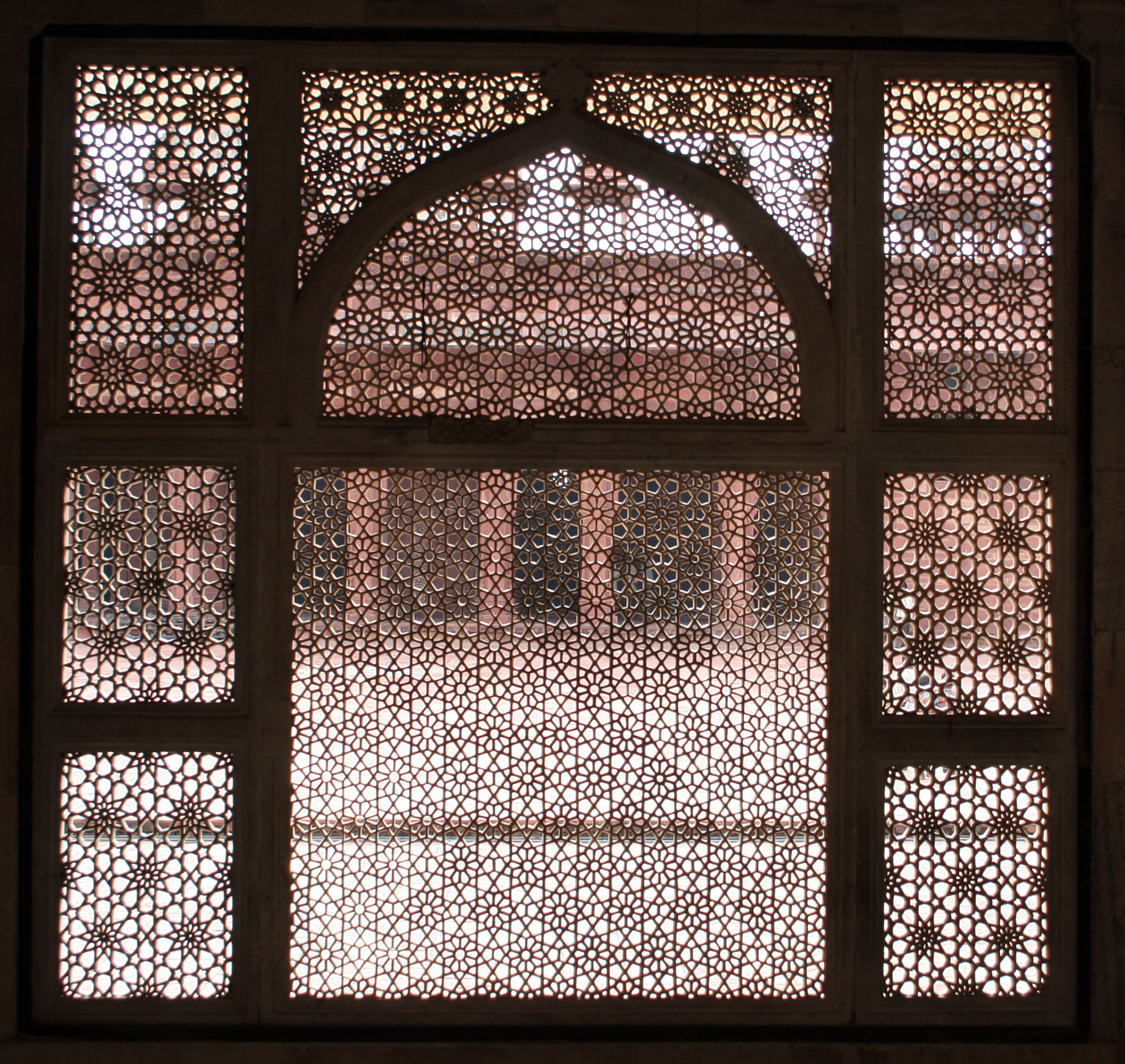
Jali pierced stone screens at the tomb of Salim Chishti, Fatehpur Sikri, India

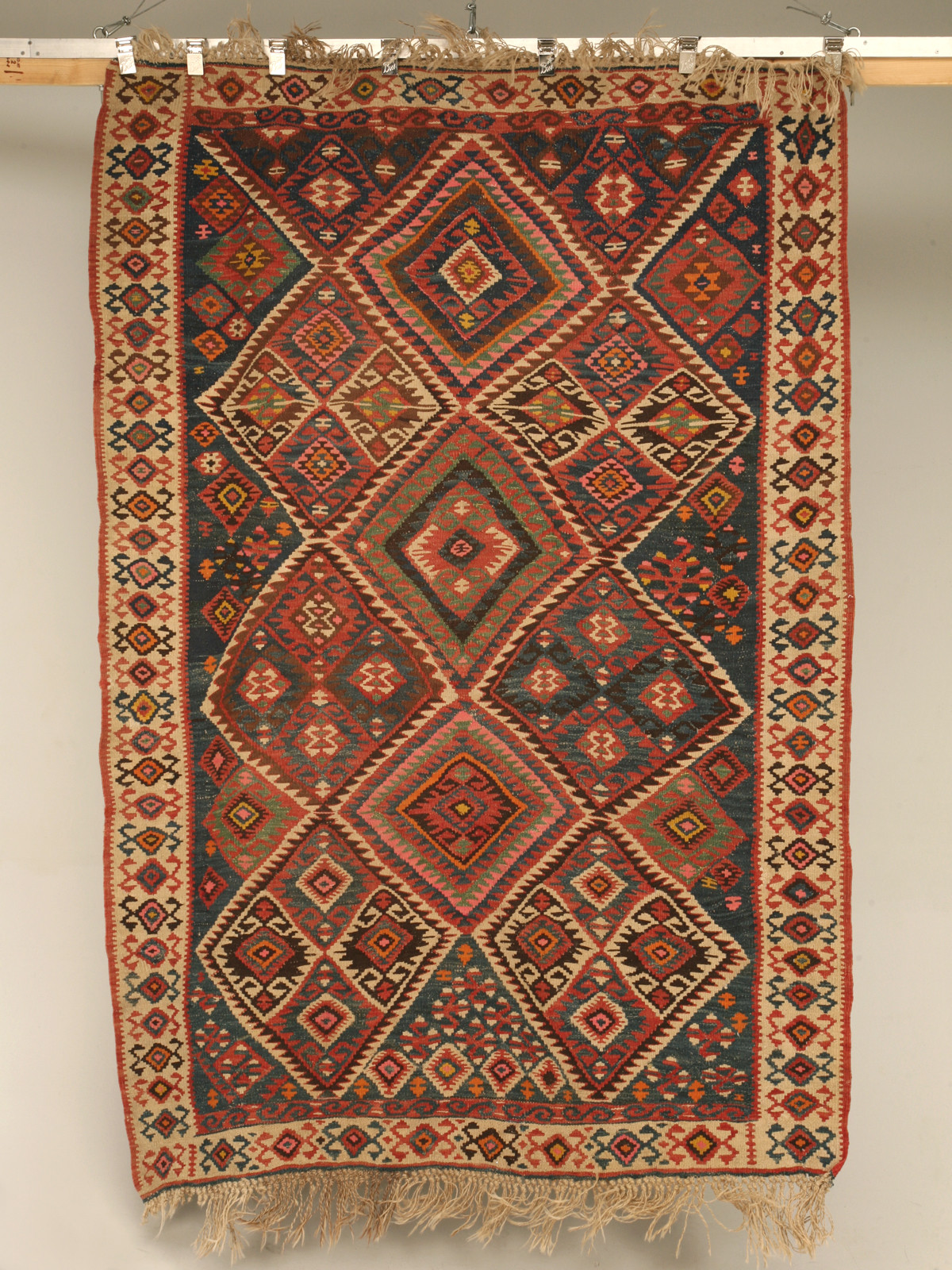
Woven wool Kilim from Turkey

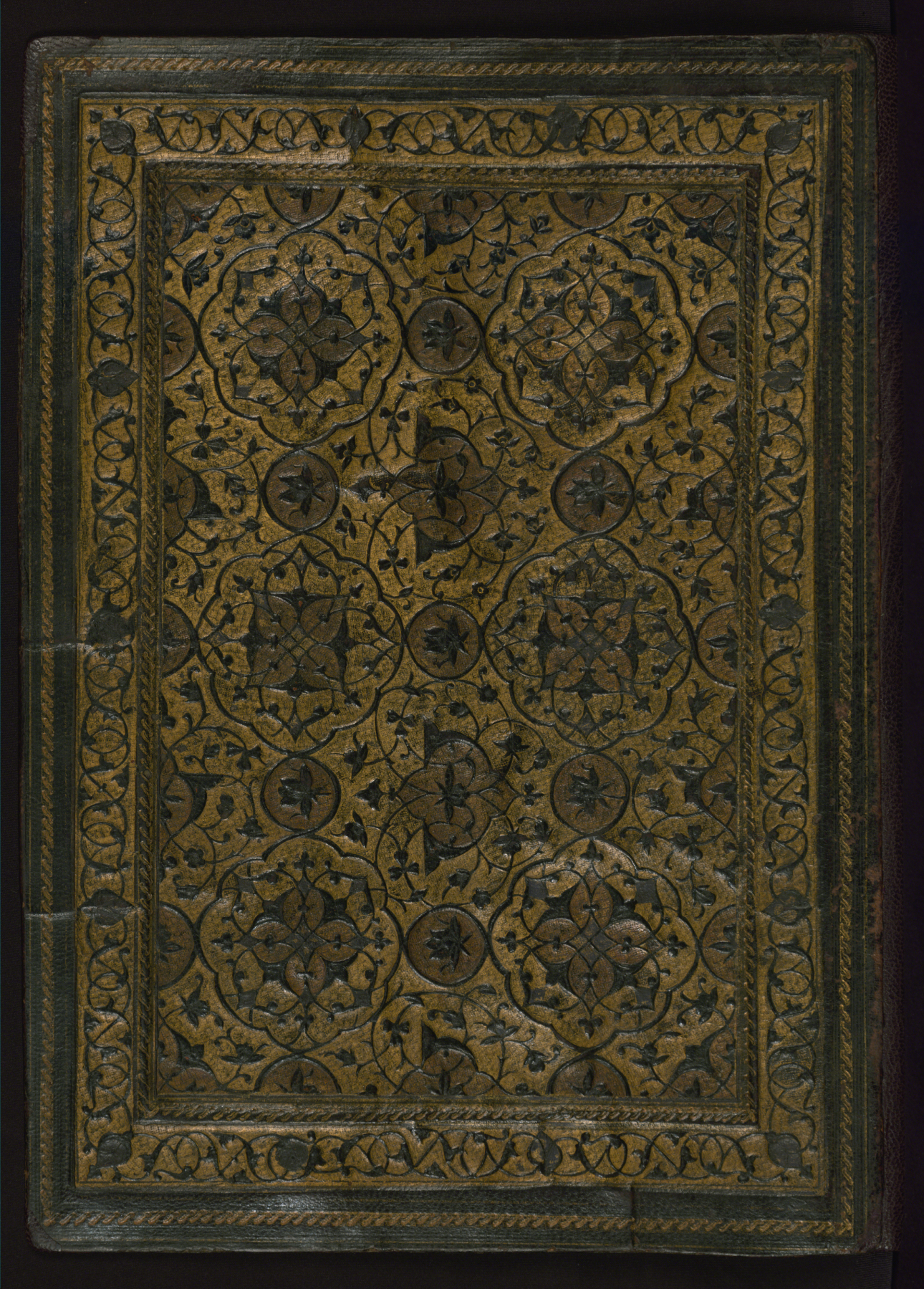
Leather prayer book cover, Persia, 16th century

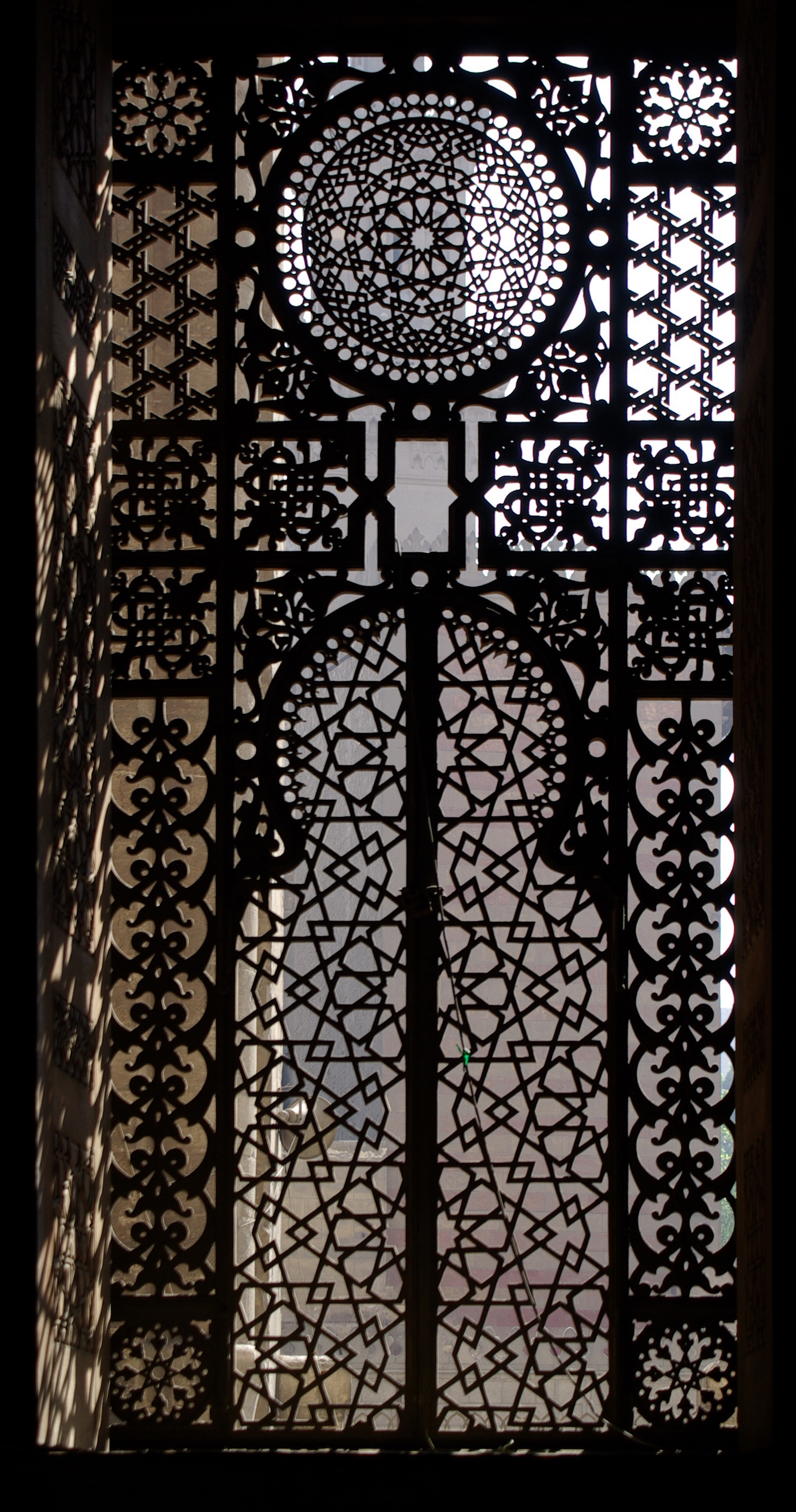
Iron gate with 10-point stars and kites at Al-Rifa'i Mosque, Cairo (1869–1912)

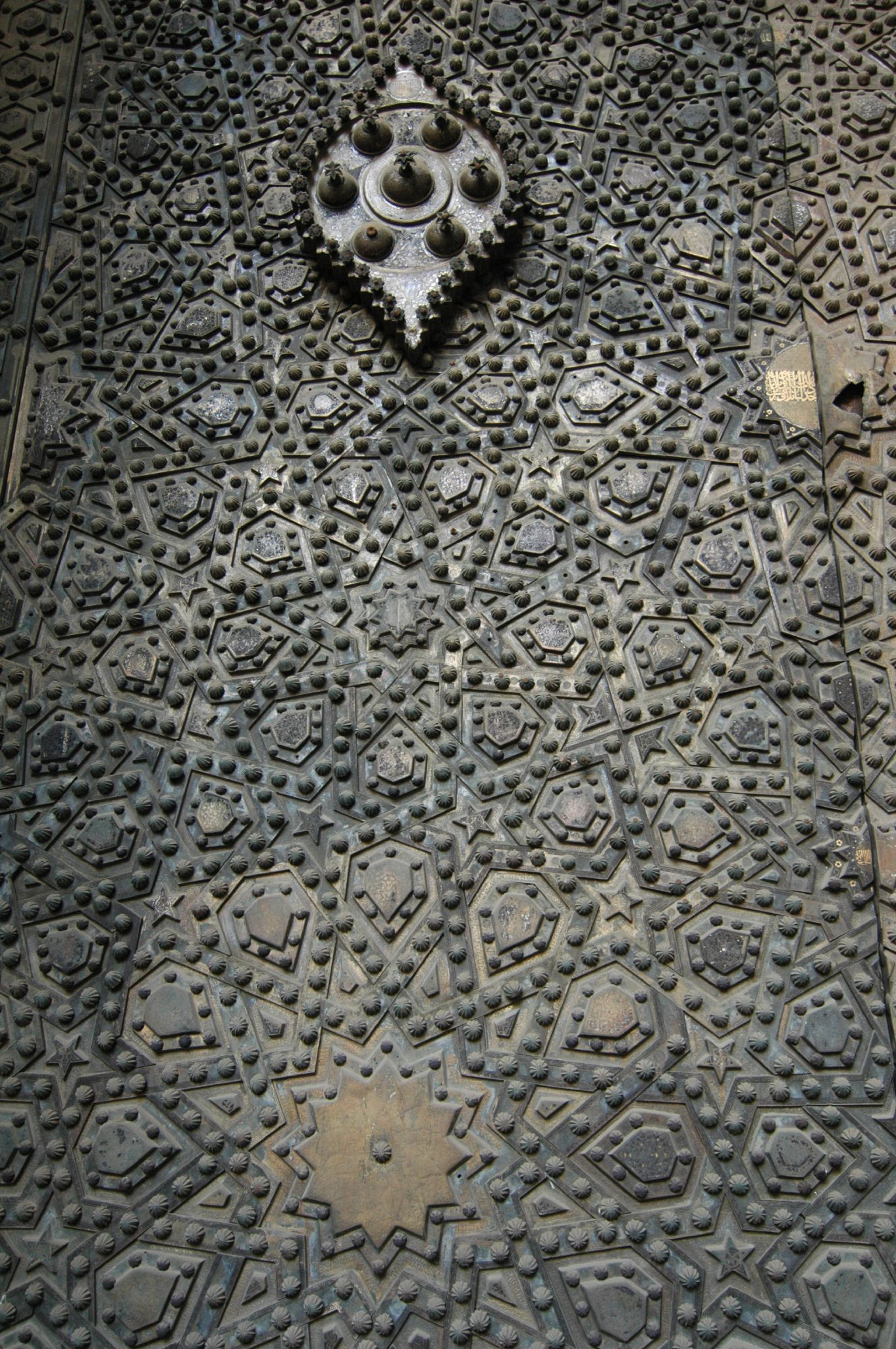
Detail of bronze door, Mosque-Madrassa of Sultan Hassan, Cairo, decorated with strapwork

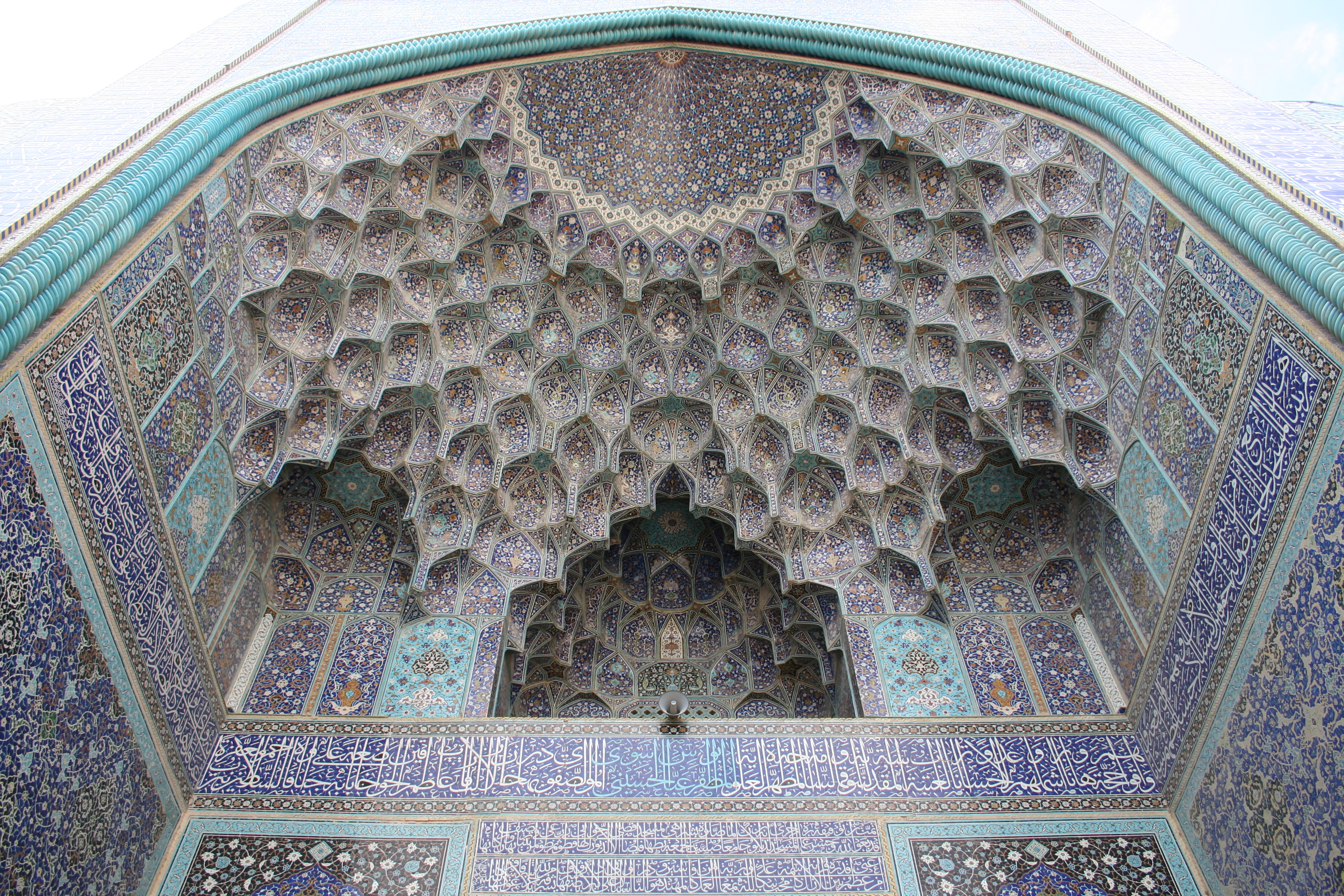
Muqarnas in Shah Mosque, Isfahan, Iran

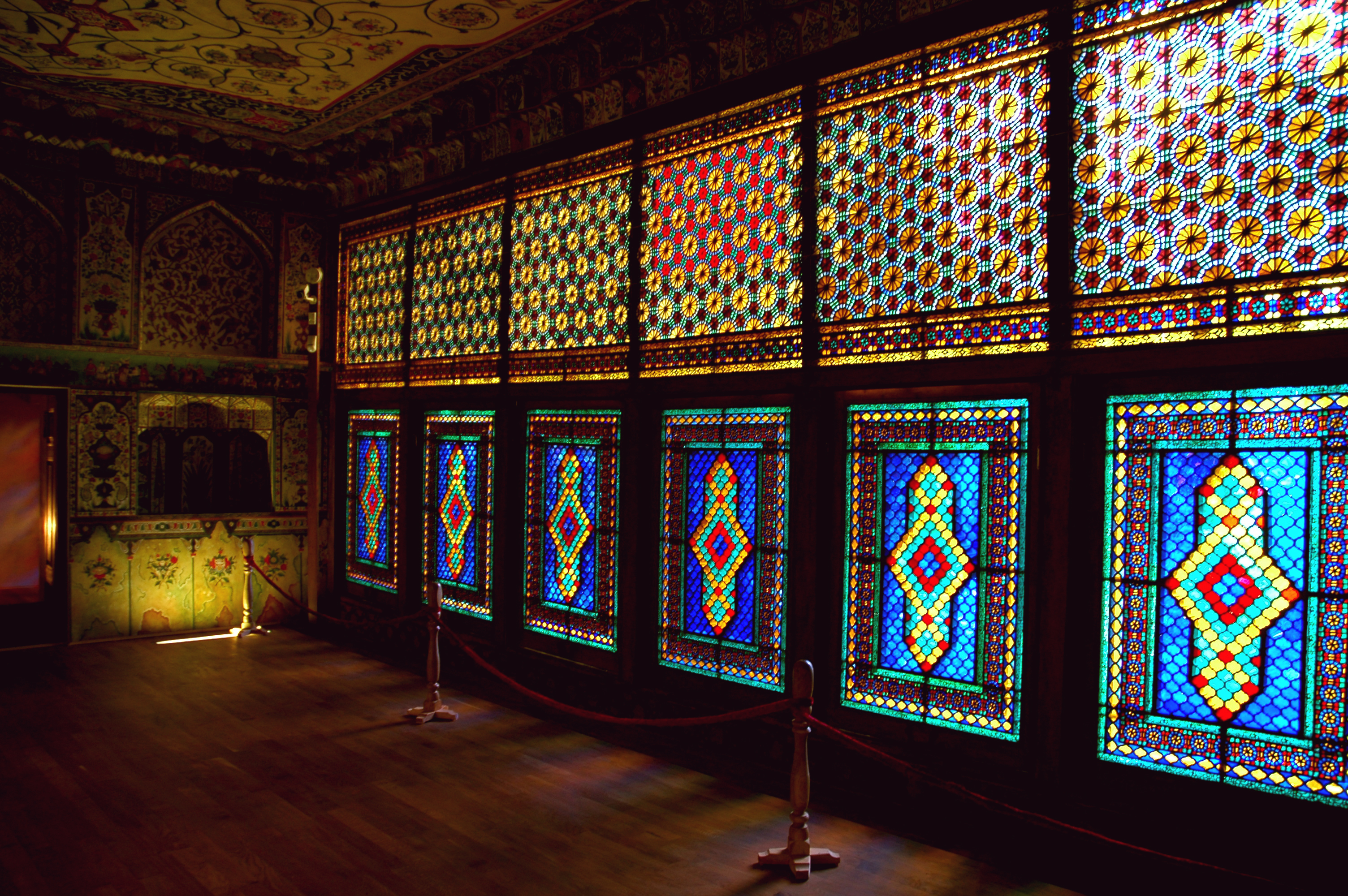
Geometric shabaka stained glass in the 1797 Palace of Shaki Khans, Azerbaijan

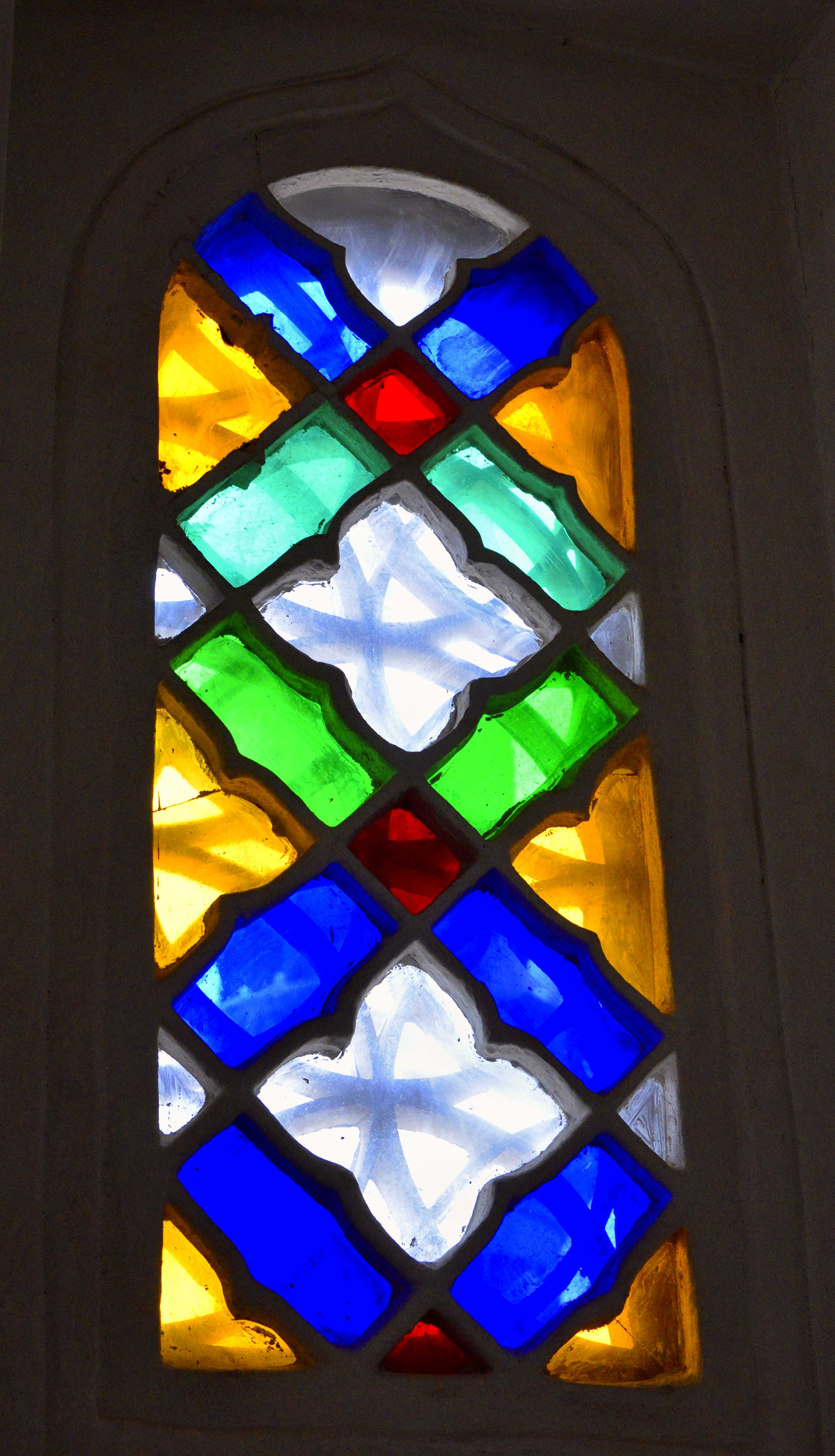
Traditional Window, Sana'a, Yemen

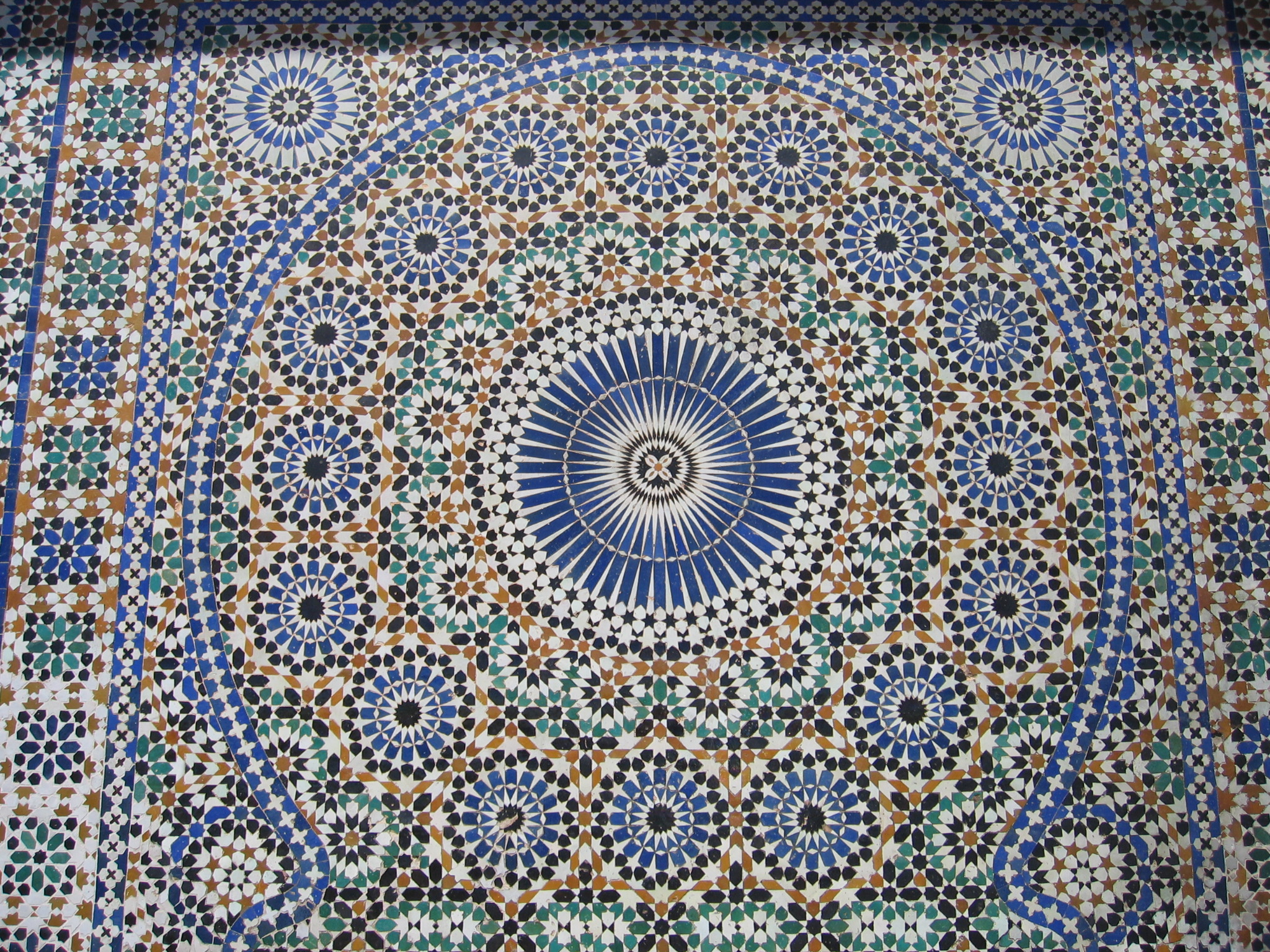
Glazed tile Zellij at Place el-Hedim in Meknes, Morocco

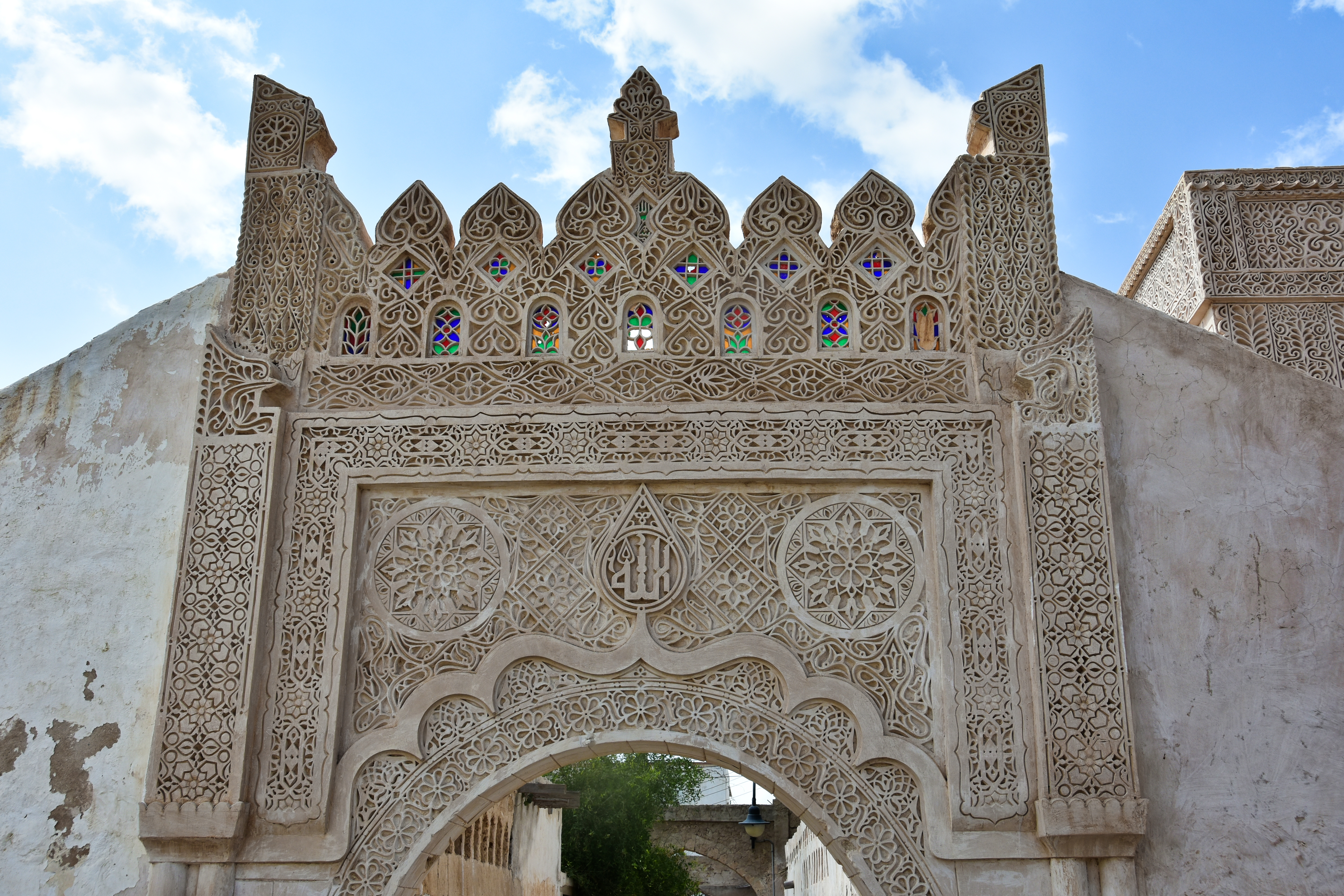
The stucco arch with small stained glass fragments in Al-Rifa'i House in Farasan Islands, Saudi Arabia (1922)

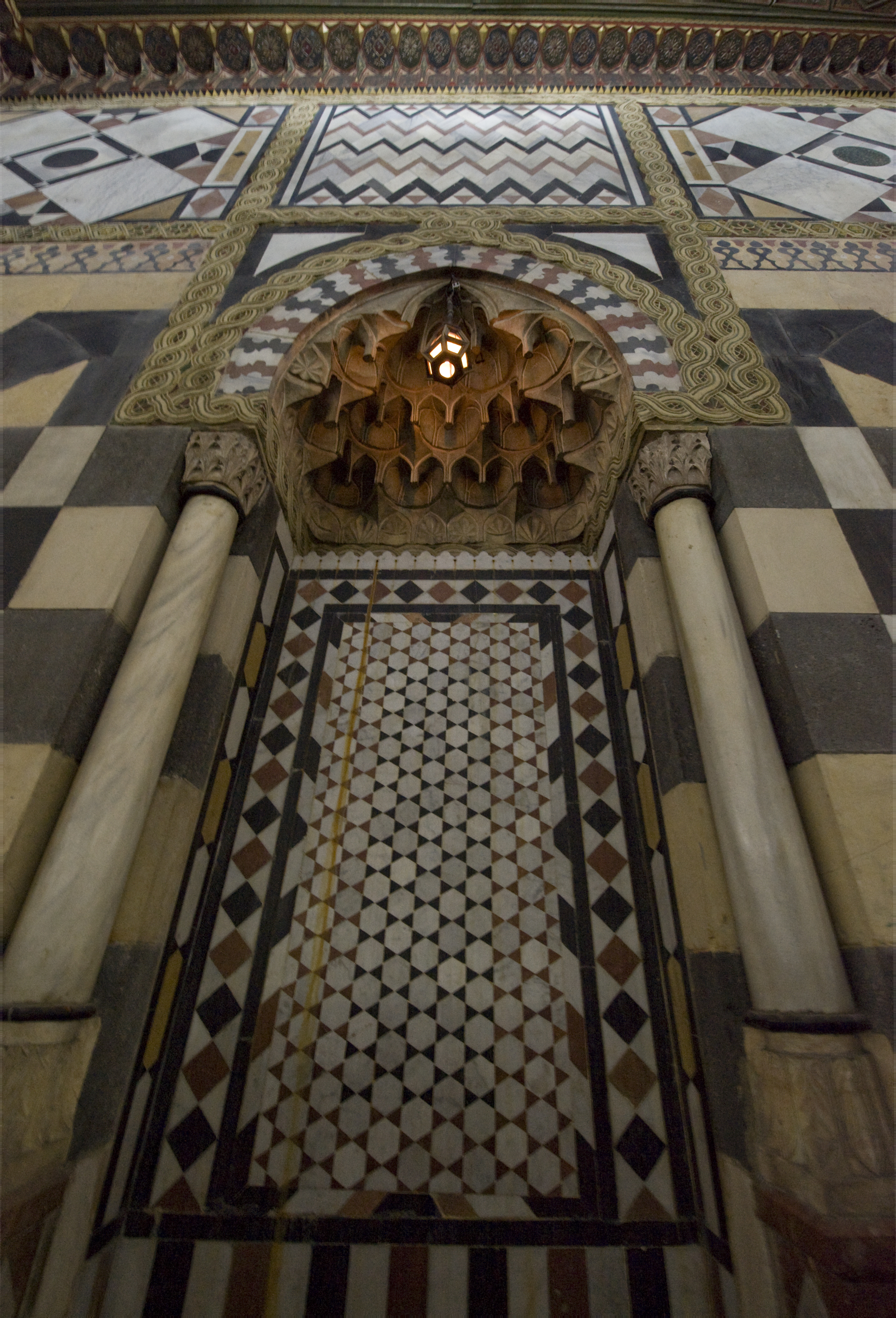
Mihrab of an 18th-century Damascene house. National Museum of Damascus, Syria

== Outside Islamic art ==
=== In Western culture ===
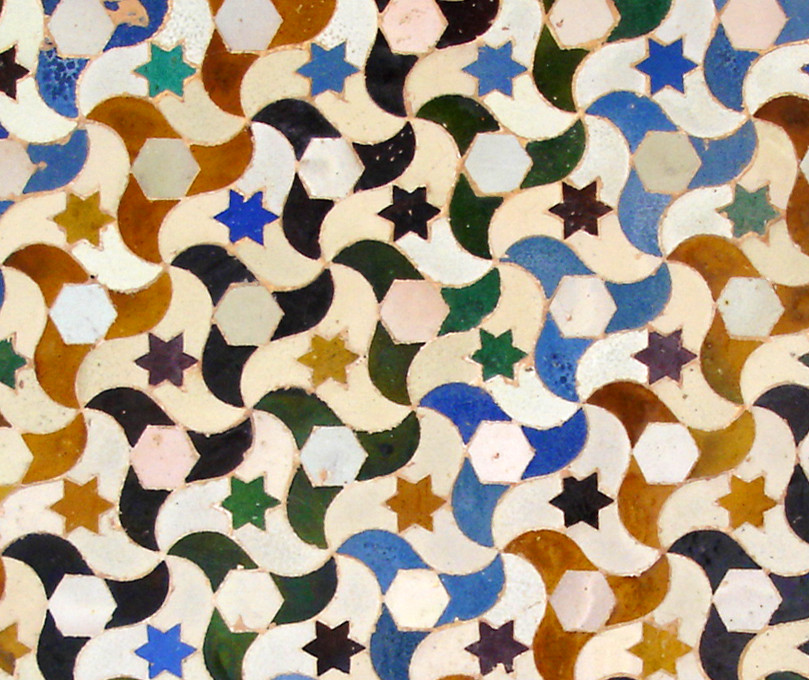
A tessellation of glazed ceramic tiles forming colourful geometric patterns in the Alhambra, Spain, which inspired M. C. Escher

It is sometimes supposed in Western society that mistakes in repetitive Islamic patterns such as those on carpets were intentionally introduced as a show of humility by artists who believed only Allah can produce perfection, but this theory is denied.

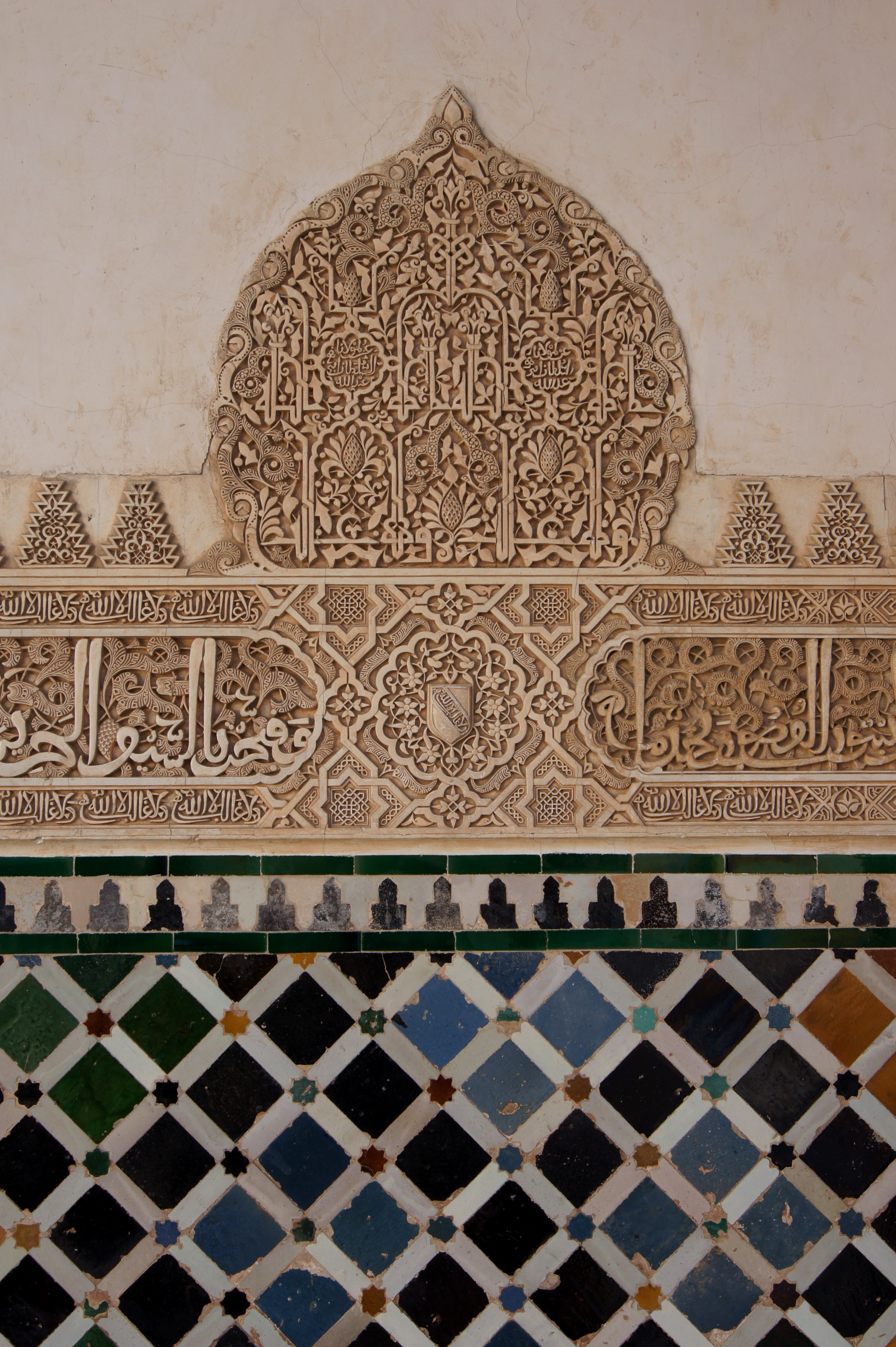
Tessellations, arabesques and calligraphy on a wall of the Myrtle court, Alhambra, Granada, Spain

Major Western collections hold many objects of widely varying materials with Islamic geometric patterns. The Victoria and Albert Museum in London holds at least 283 such objects, of materials including wallpaper, carved wood, inlaid wood, tin- or lead-glazed earthenware, brass, stucco, glass, woven silk, ivory, and pen or pencil drawings. The Metropolitan Museum of Art in New York has among other relevant holdings 124 mediaeval (1000–1400 A.D.) objects bearing Islamic geometric patterns, including a pair of Egyptian minbar (pulpit) doors almost 2 m. high in rosewood and mulberry inlaid with ivory and ebony; and an entire mihrab (prayer niche) from Isfahan, decorated with polychrome mosaic, and weighing over 2,000 kg.

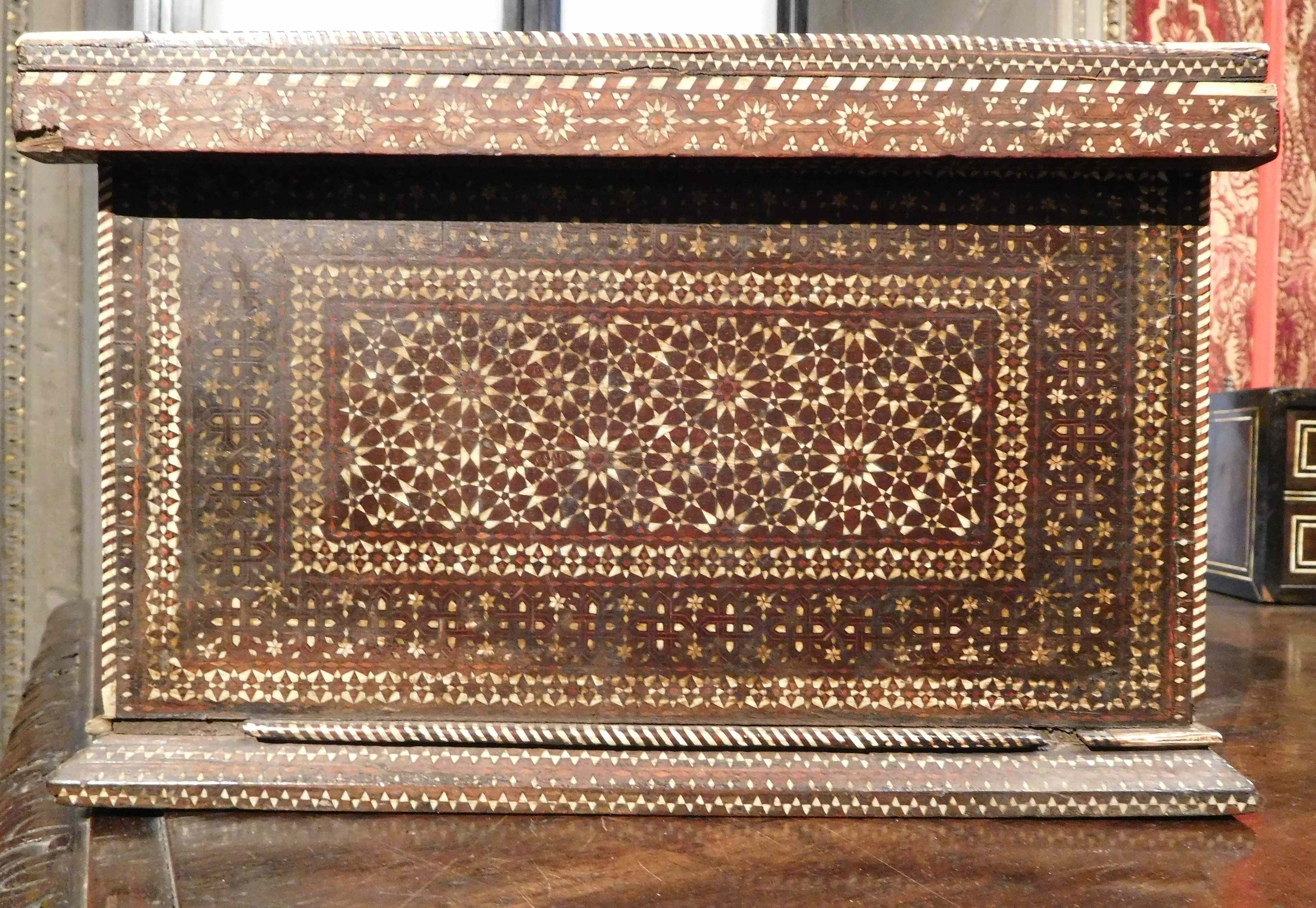
Wooden box inlaid with ivory with zellij-like geometrical motifs. Italy (Florence or Venice) 15th century.

Islamic decoration and craftsmanship had a significant influence on Western art when Venetian merchants brought goods of many types back to Italy from the 14th century onwards.

The Dutch artist M. C. Escher was inspired by the Alhambra's intricate decorative designs to study the mathematics of tessellation, transforming his style and influencing the rest of his artistic career. In his own words it was "the richest source of inspiration I have ever tapped."

=== Influence on the sciences ===
Cultural organisations such as the Mathematical Sciences Research Institute and the Institute for Advanced Study run events on geometric patterns and related aspects of Islamic art. In 2013 the Istanbul Center of Design and the Ensar Foundation ran what they claimed was the first ever symposium of Islamic Arts and Geometric Patterns, in Istanbul. The panel included the experts on Islamic geometric pattern Carol Bier, (Note: Bier is a historian of Islamic art who studies pattern.) Jay Bonner, (Note: Bonner is an architect specialising in Islamic ornament.) Eric Broug, (Note: Broug writes books and runs courses on Islamic geometric design.) Hacali Necefoğlu (Note: Necefoğlu is a professor of chemistry at Kafkas University interested in pattern and crystallography.) and Reza Sarhangi. (Note: Sarhangi is the founder of The Bridges Organization. He studies the mathematics of Persian architecture and mosaic design.) In Britain, The Prince's School of Traditional Arts runs a range of courses in Islamic art including geometry, calligraphy, and arabesque (vegetal forms), tile-making, and plaster carving.

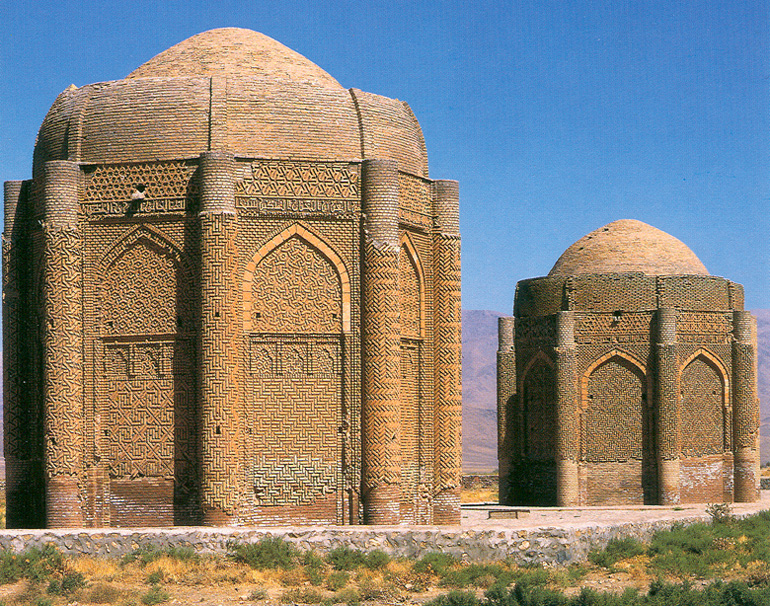
Tomb towers of two Seljuk princes at Kharaghan, Qazvin province, Iran, covered with many different brick patterns like those that inspired Ahmad Rafsanjani to create auxetic materials

Computer graphics and computer-aided manufacturing make it possible to design and produce Islamic geometric patterns effectively and economically. Craig S. Kaplan explains and illustrates in his Ph.D. thesis how Islamic star patterns can be generated algorithmically.

Two physicists, Peter J. Lu and Paul Steinhardt, stated in 2007 that girih designs such as that used on the Darb-e Imam shrine (Note: Illustrated above.) in Isfahan were able to create quasi-periodic tilings resembling those discovered by Roger Penrose in 1973. They showed that rather than the traditional ruler and compass construction, it was possible to create girih designs using a set of five "girih tiles", all equilateral polygons, secondarily decorated with lines (for the strapwork).

In 2016, Ahmad Rafsanjani described the use of Islamic geometric patterns from tomb towers in Iran to create auxetic materials from perforated rubber sheets. These are stable in either a contracted or an expanded state, and can switch between the two, which might be useful for surgical stents or for spacecraft components. When a conventional material is stretched along one axis, it contracts along other axes (at right angles to the stretch). But auxetic materials expand at right angles to the pull. The internal structure that enables this unusual behaviour is inspired by two of the 70 Islamic patterns that Rafsanjani noted on the tomb towers.
