= Motif (visual arts) =

Figurative element of an artwork

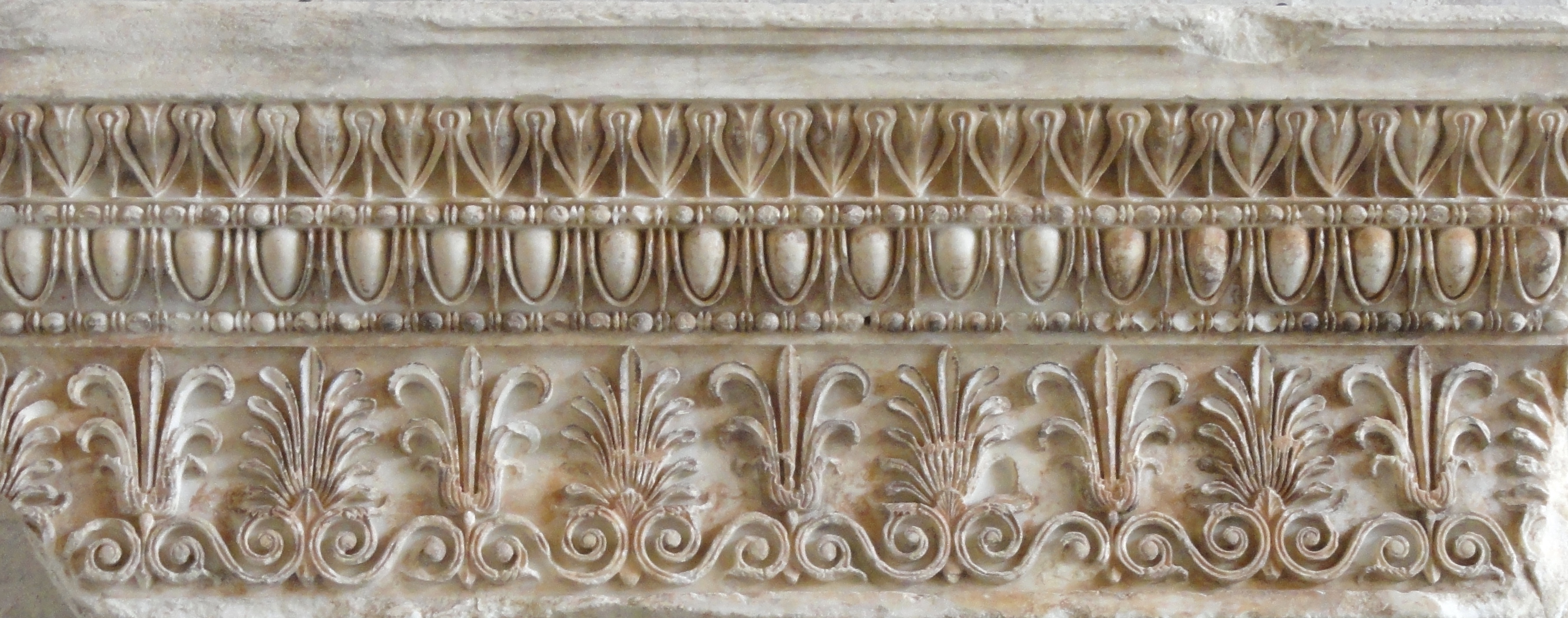
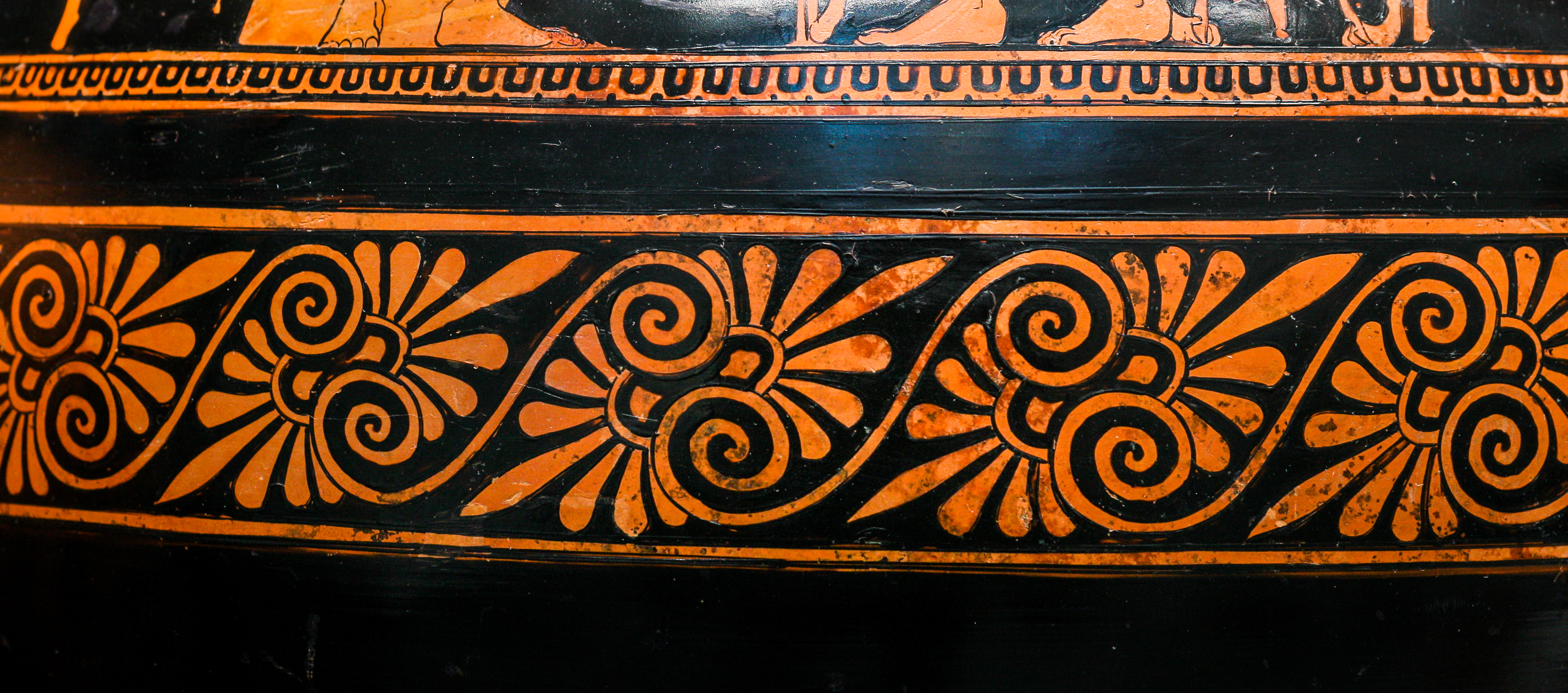
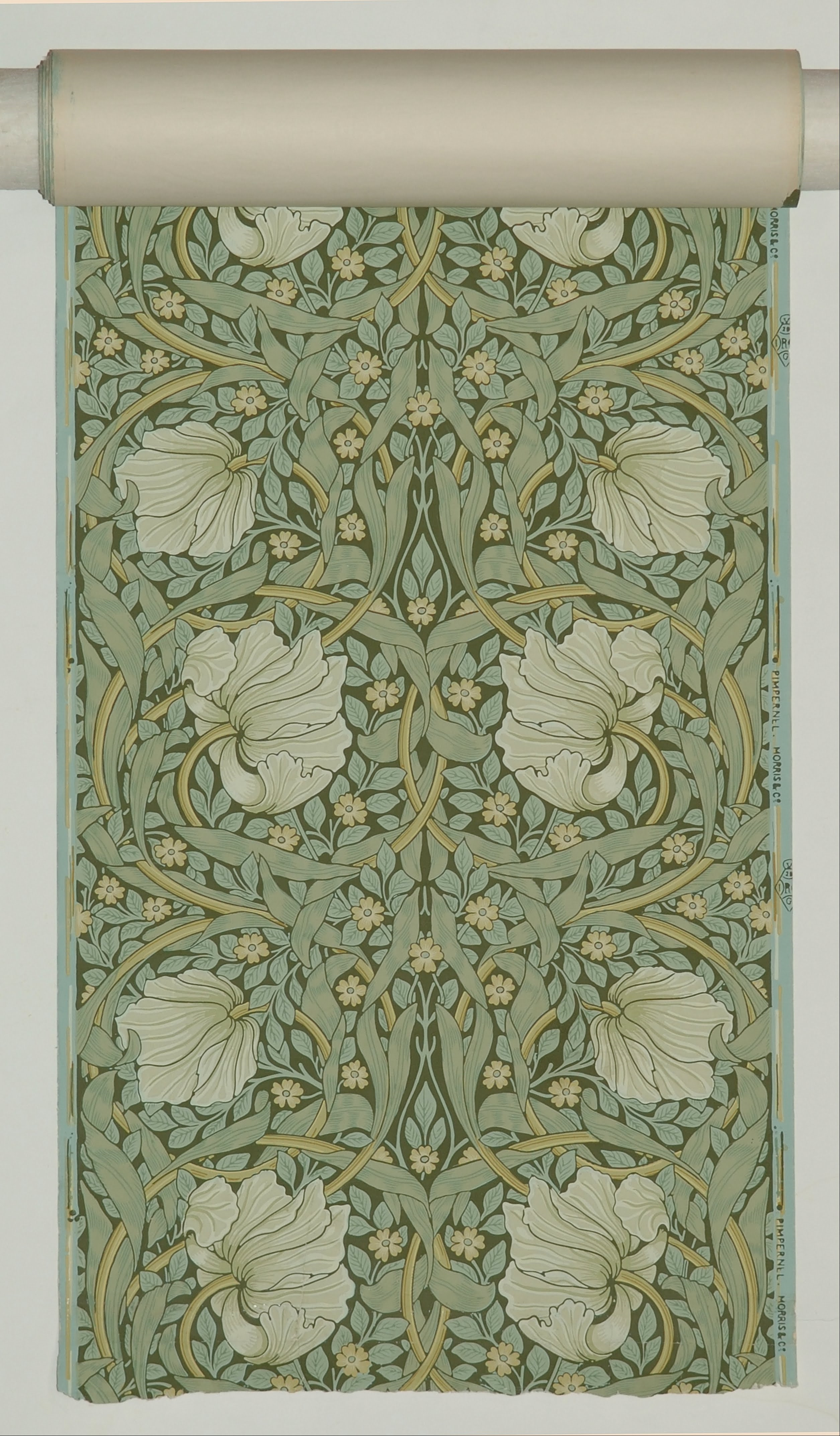
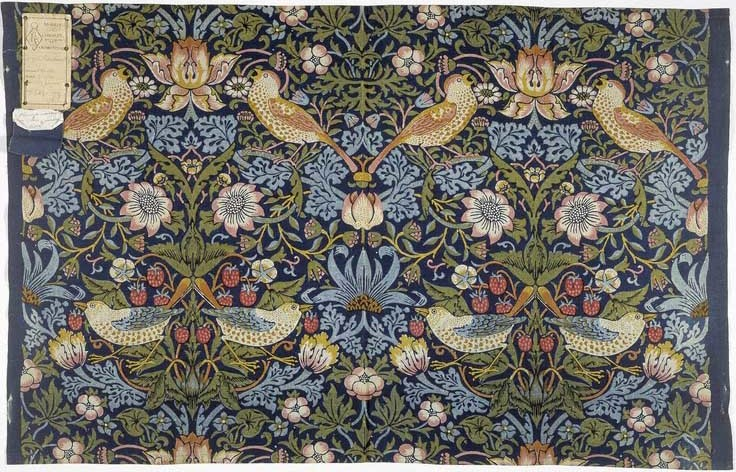
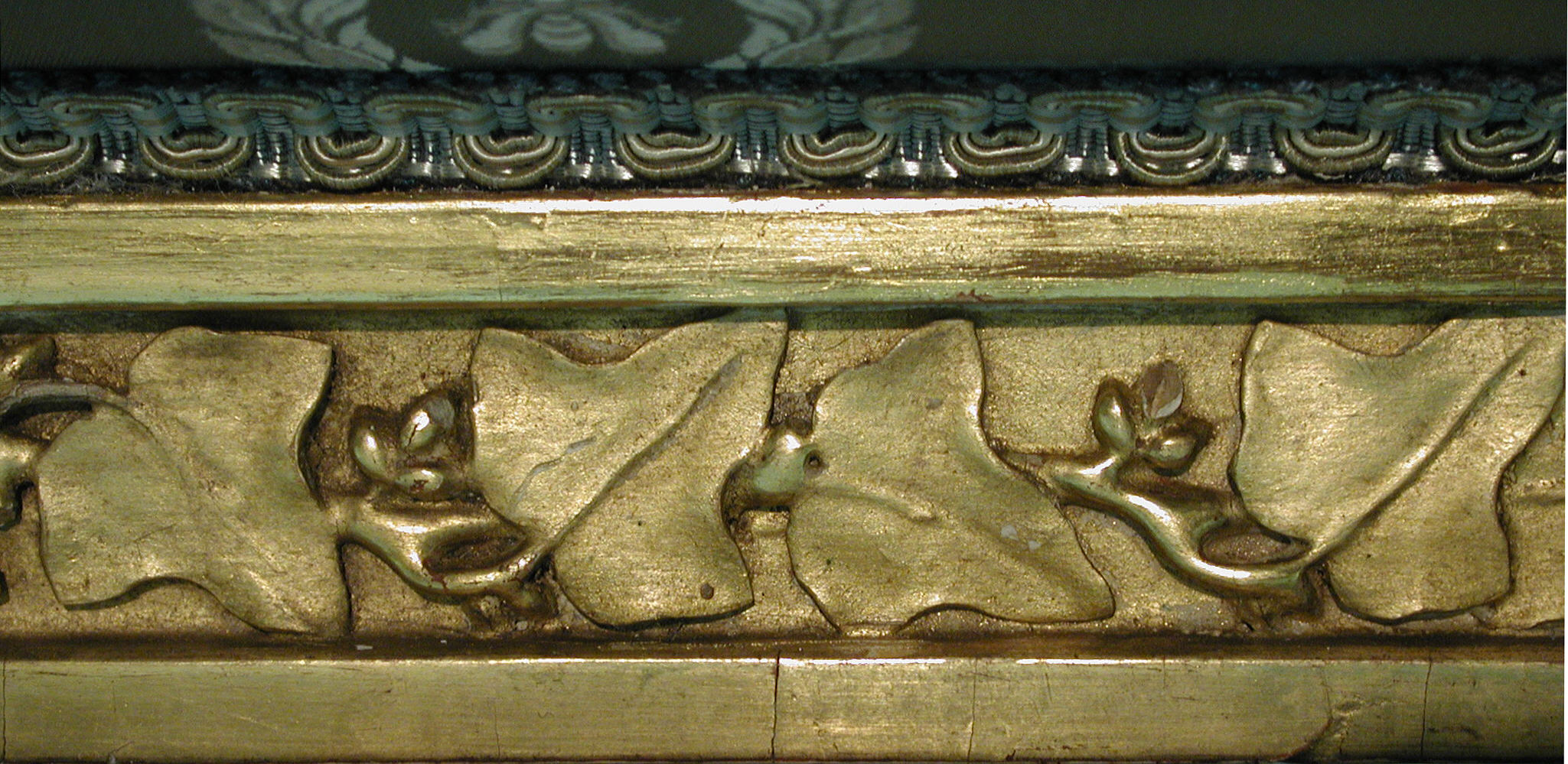
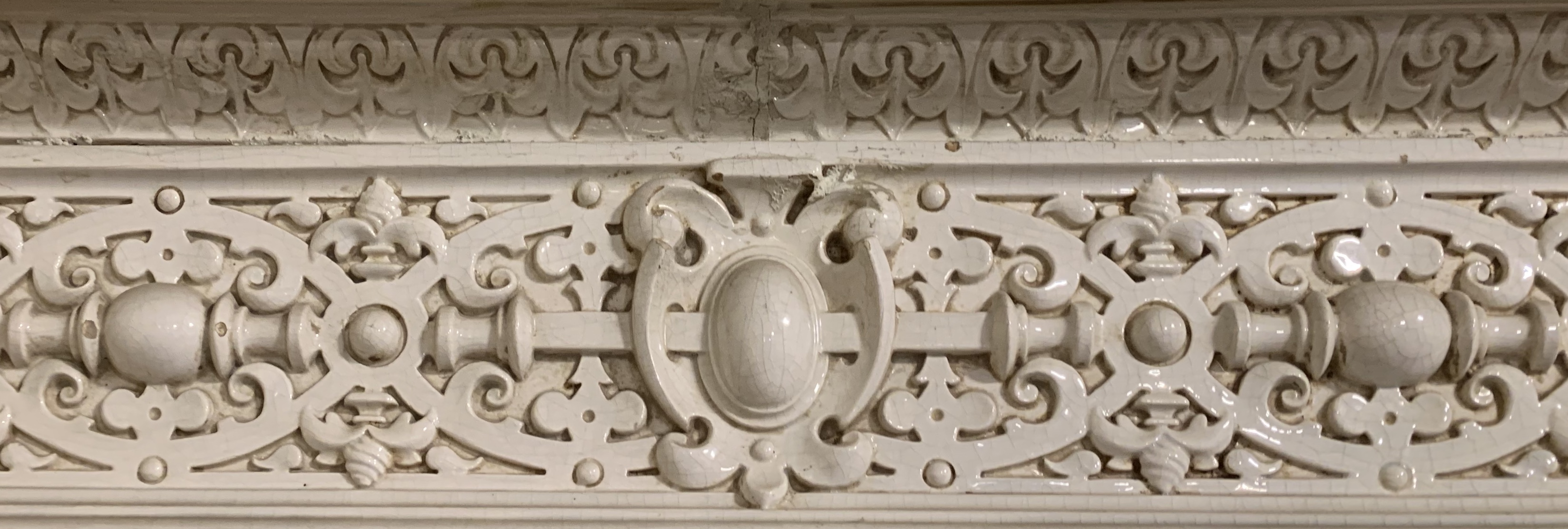
Motifs in art from different cultures

In art and iconography, a motif (/moʊˈtiːf/) is an element of an image. Motifs can occur both in figurative and narrative art, and in ornament and geometric art. A motif may be repeated in a pattern or design, often many times, or may just occur once in a work.

A motif may be an element in the iconography of a particular subject or type of subject that is seen in other works, or may form the main subject, as the Master of Animals motif in ancient art typically does. The related motif of confronted animals is often seen alone, but may also be repeated, for example in Byzantine silk and in other ancient textiles. Where the main subject of an artistic work - such as a painting - is a specific person, group, or moment in a narrative, that should be referred to as the "subject" of the work, not a motif, though the same thing may be a "motif" when part of another subject, or part of a work of decorative art - such as a painting on a vase.

Ornamental or decorative art can usually be analysed into a number of different elements, which can be called motifs. These may often, as in textile art, be repeated many times in a pattern. Important examples in Western art include acanthus, egg and dart, and various types of scrollwork.

== Some examples ==
Geometric, typically repeated: meander, palmette, rosette, gul in Oriental rugs, acanthus, egg and dart, Bead and reel, Pakudos, Swastika, Adinkra symbols.

Figurative: Master of Animals, confronted animals, velificatio, Death and the Maiden, Three hares, Sheela na gig, puer mingens. In the Nativity of Jesus in art, the detail of showing Saint Joseph as asleep, which was common in medieval depictions, can be regarded as a "motif".

Many designs in Islamic culture are motifs, including those of the sun, moon, animals such as horses and lions, flowers, and landscapes. In kilim flatwoven carpets, motifs such as the hands-on-hips elibelinde are woven in to the design to express the hopes and concerns of the weavers: the elibelinde symbolises the female principle and fertility, including the desire for children.

Pennsylvania Dutch hex signs are a familiar type of motif in the eastern portions of the United States. Their circular and symmetric design, and their use of brightly colored patterns from nature, such as stars, compass roses, doves, hearts, tulips, leaves, and feathers have made them quite popular.

The idea of a motif has become used more broadly in discussing literature and other narrative arts for an element in the story that represents a theme.

== Gallery ==
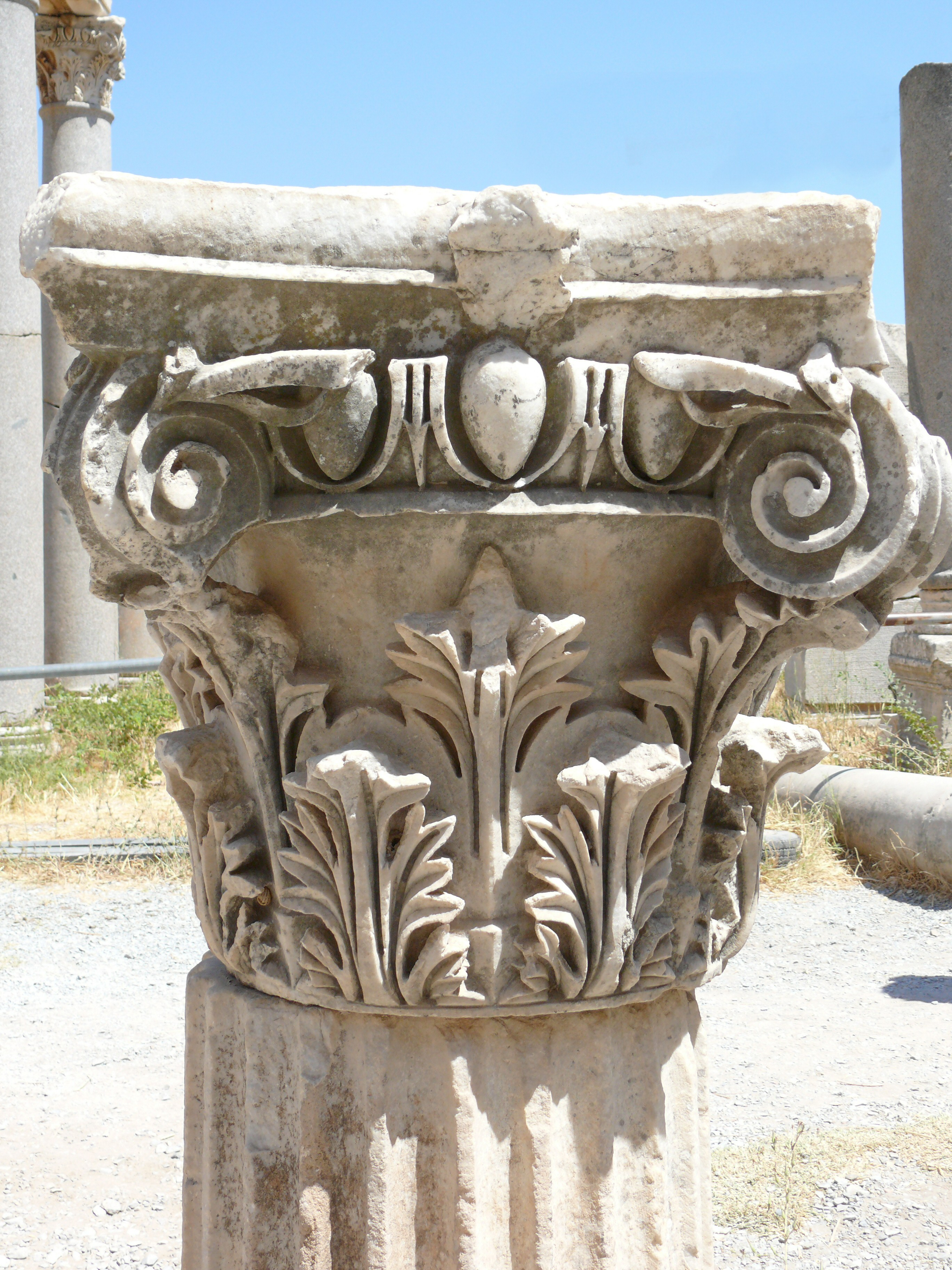
Composite capital whose design includes acanthus leaf, and volute motifs

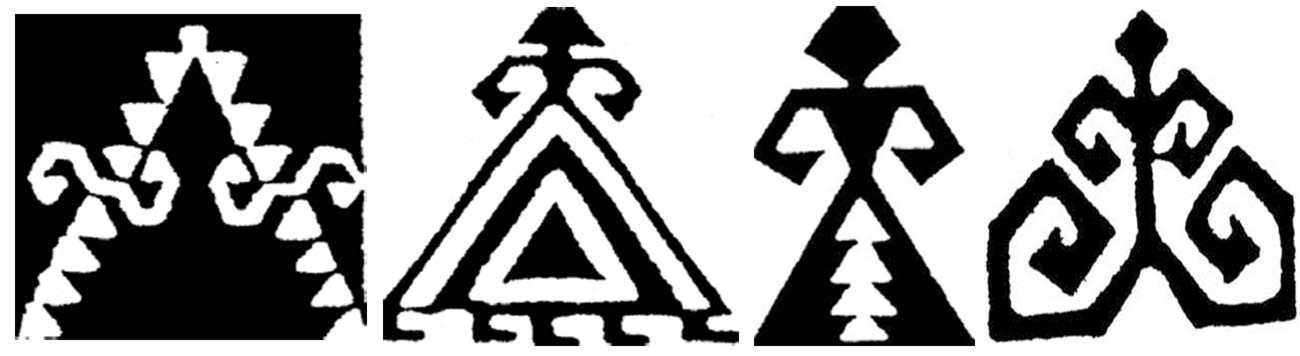
Elibelinde kilim motifs, symbolising fertility

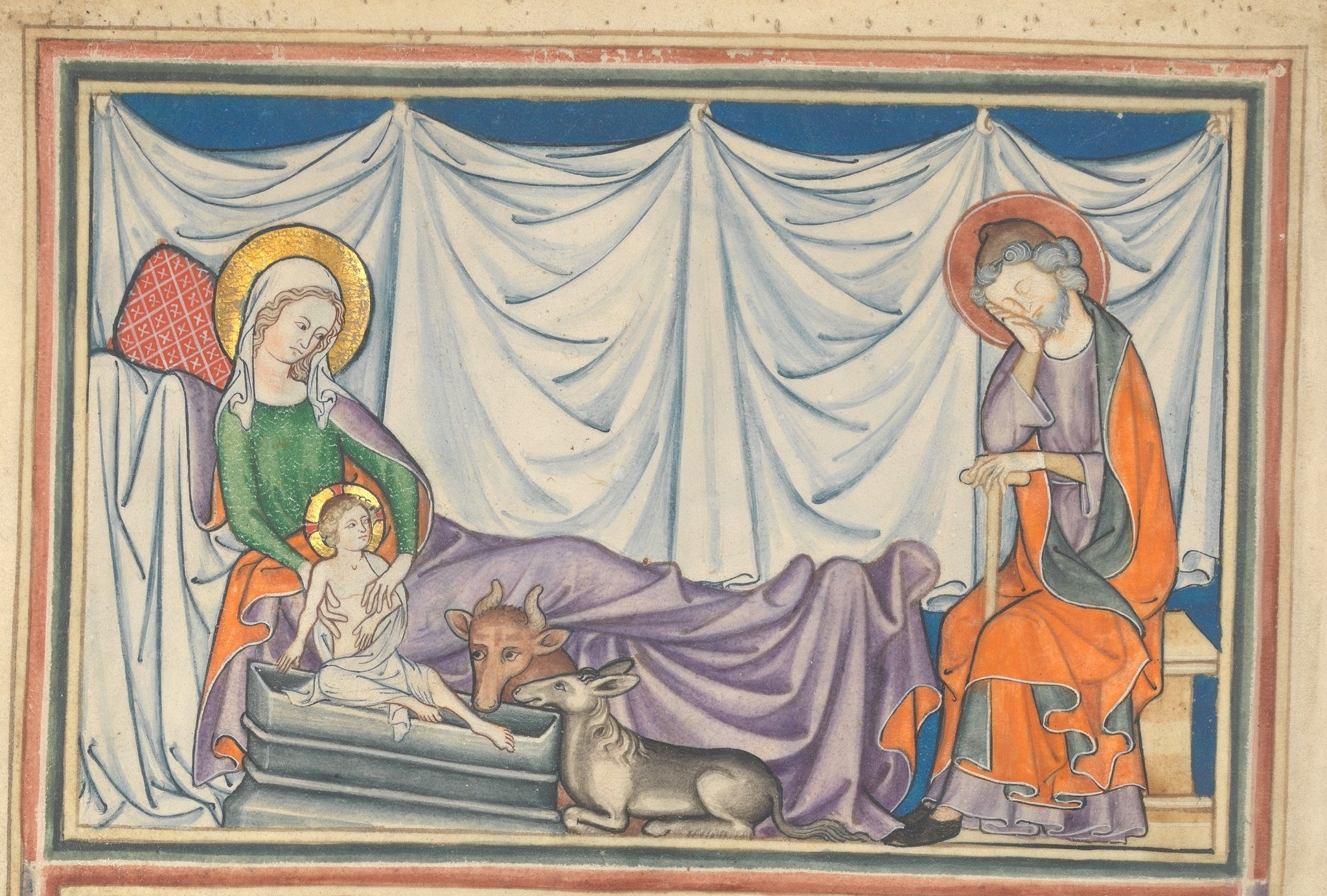
Saint Joseph sleeps through the Nativity, Cloisters Apocalypse, c. 1330

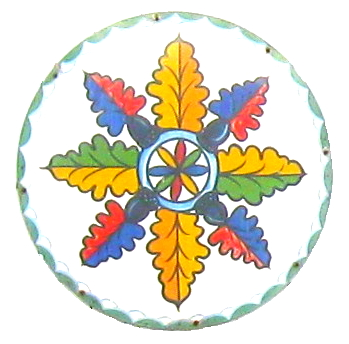
Pennsylvania Dutch motif known as a hex sign

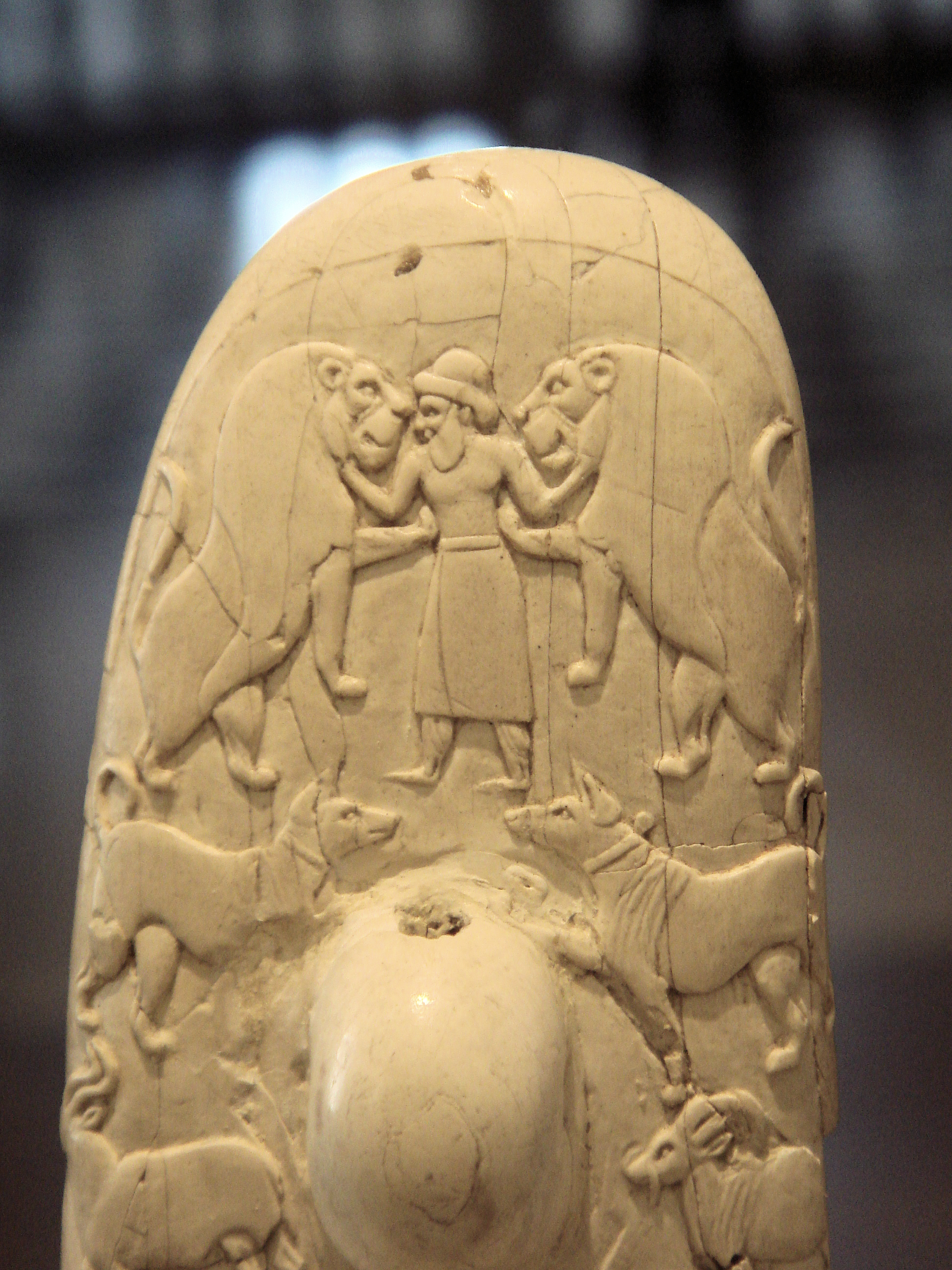
Gebel el-Arak Knife with Master of Animals motif at the top of the handle

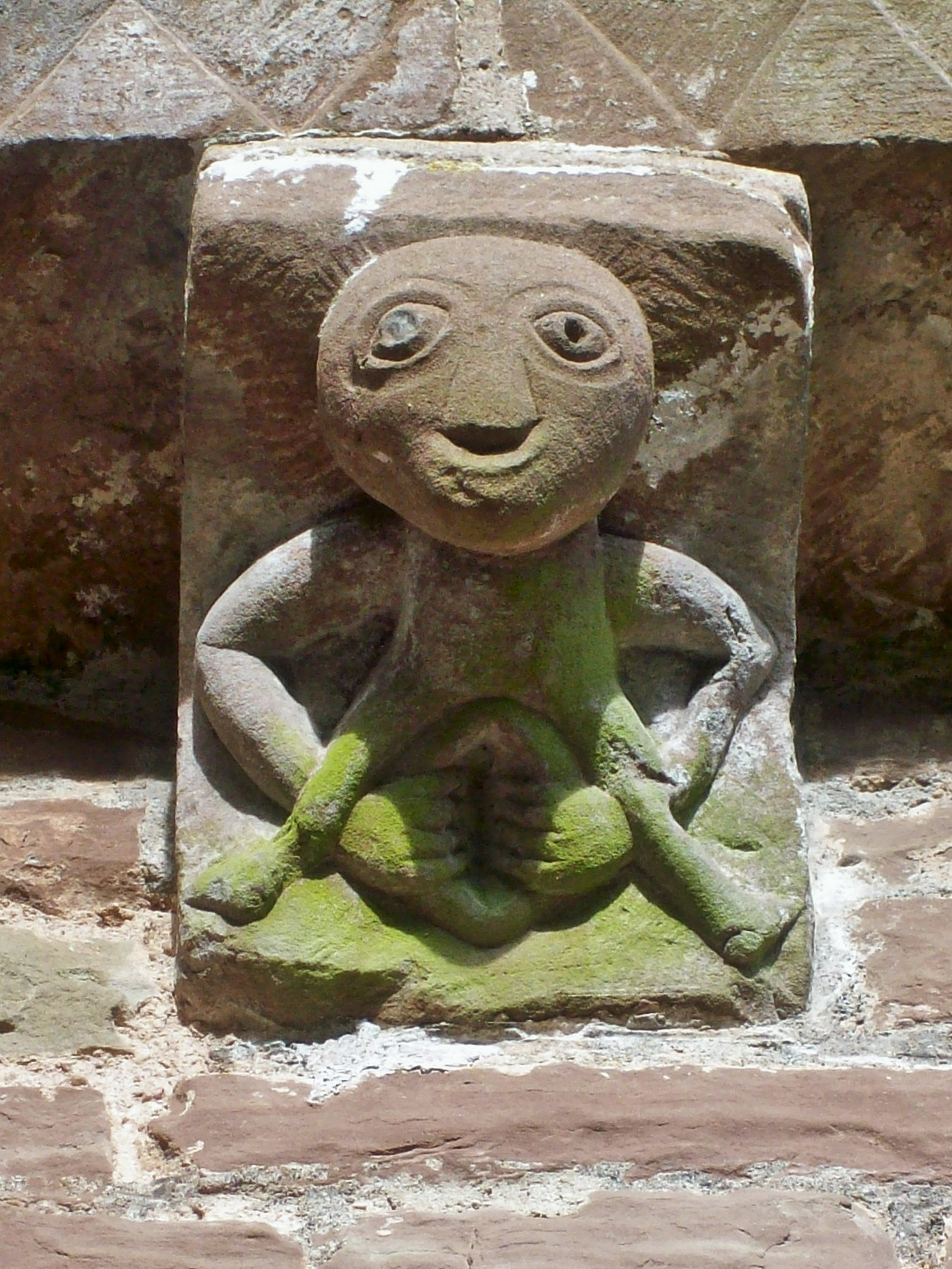
12th century sheela na gig on the Church, at Kilpeck (England)

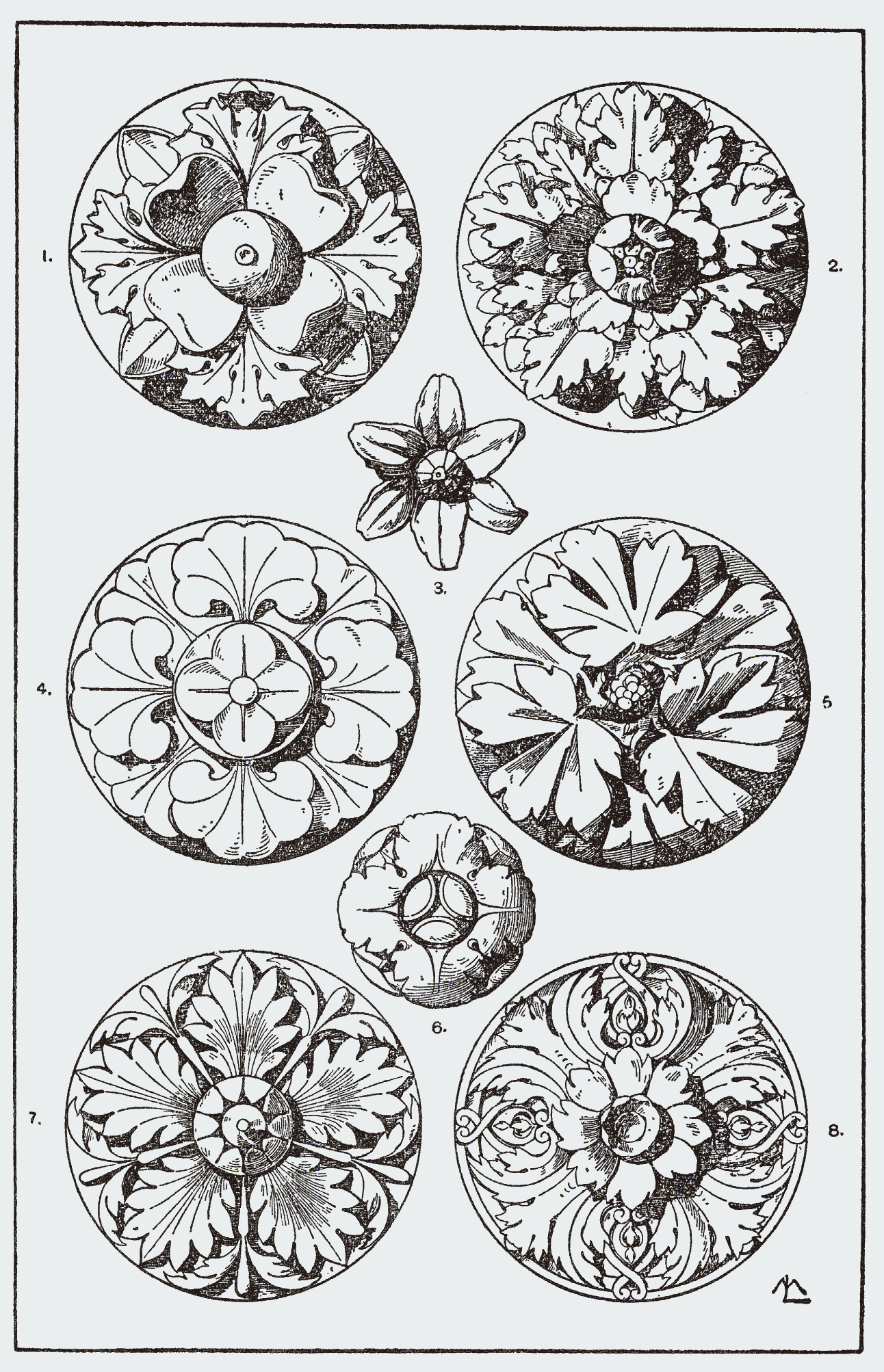
Rosette designs from Meyer's Handbook of Ornament

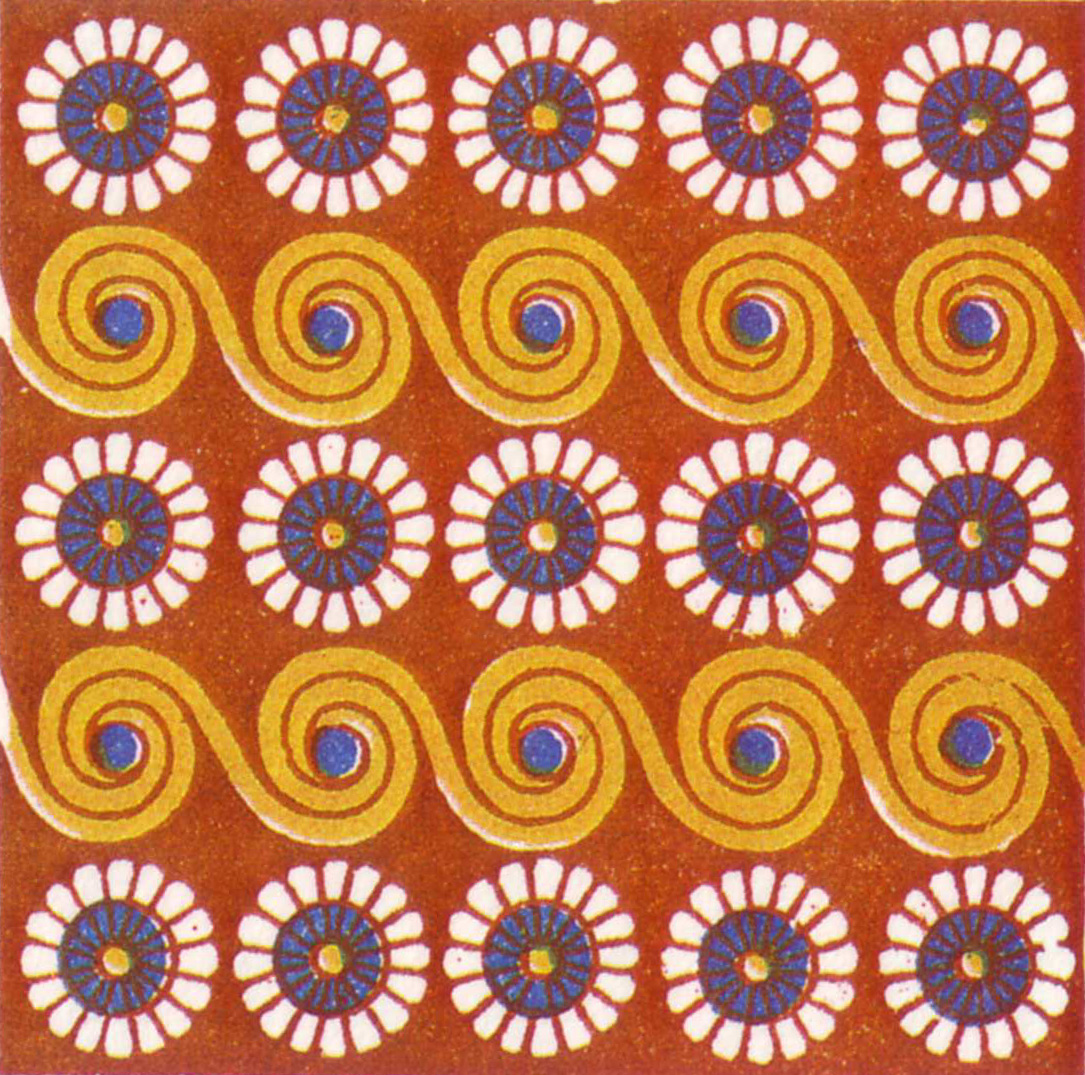
Illustration from The Grammar of Ornament Egyptian No 7 (plate 10), image #20

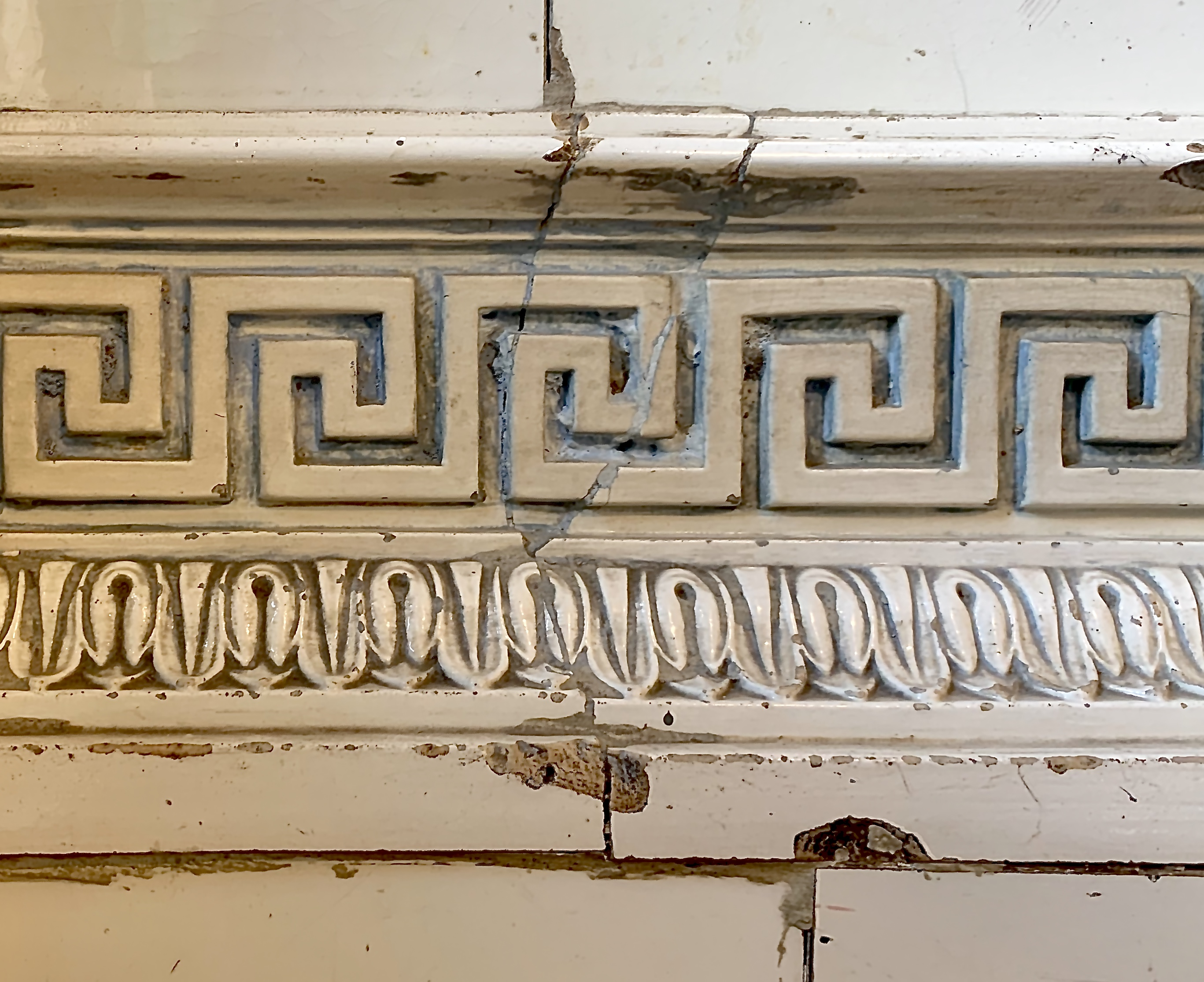
Greek key tiles on a stove in a house from Bucharest (Romania)

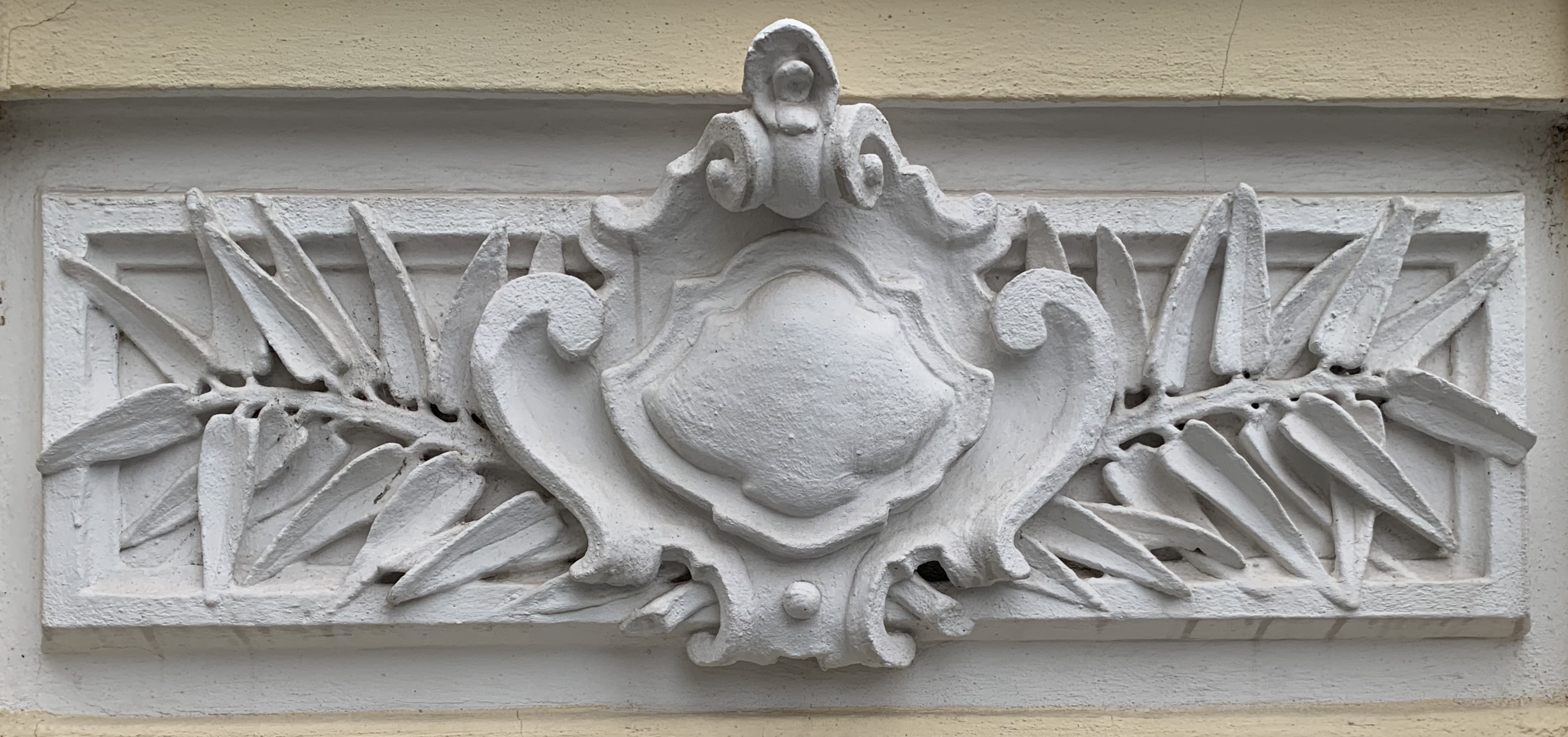
A cartouche on a Neo-Baroque city-house from Bucharest

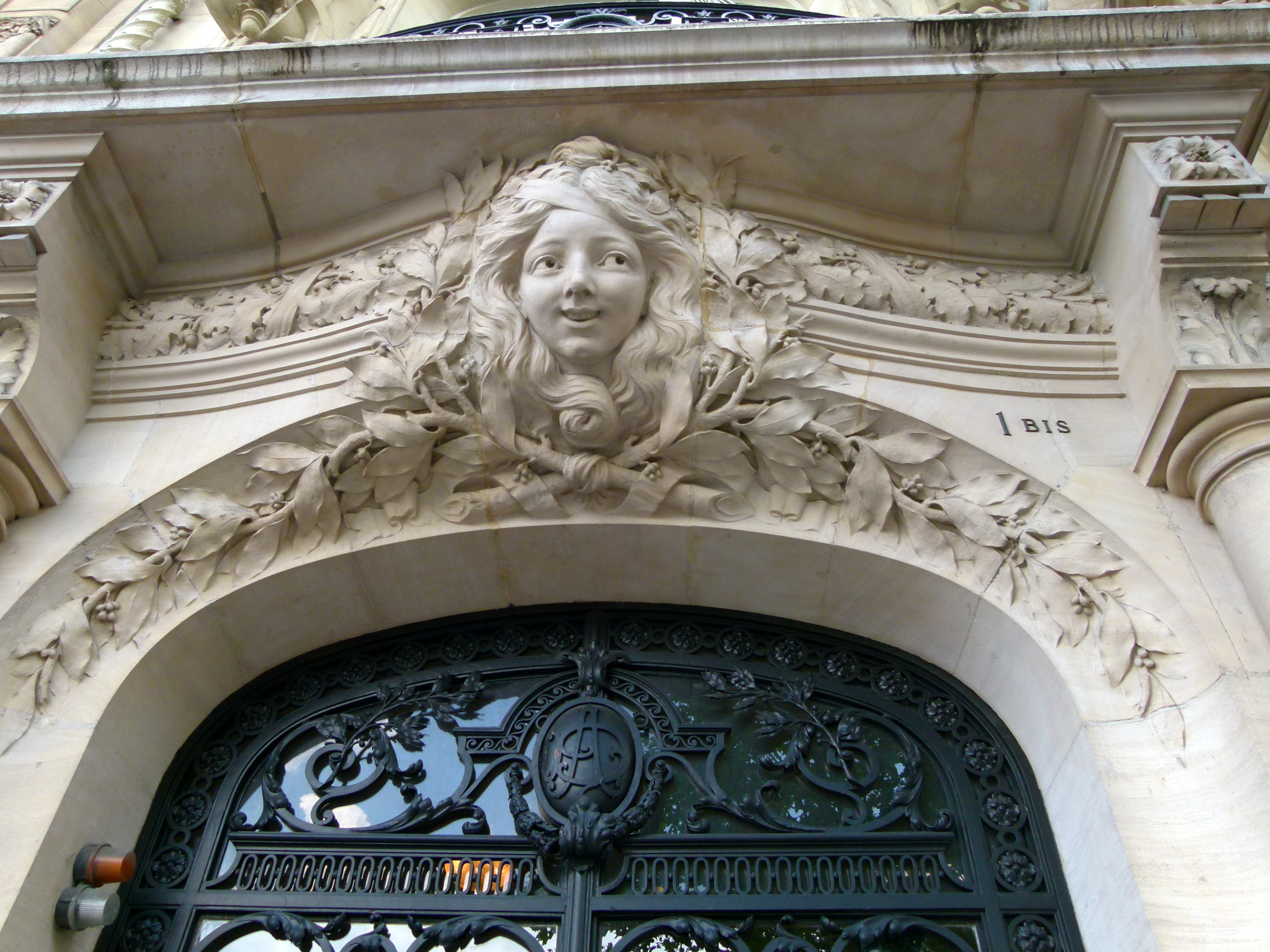
Art Nouveau mascaron above a door in Paris

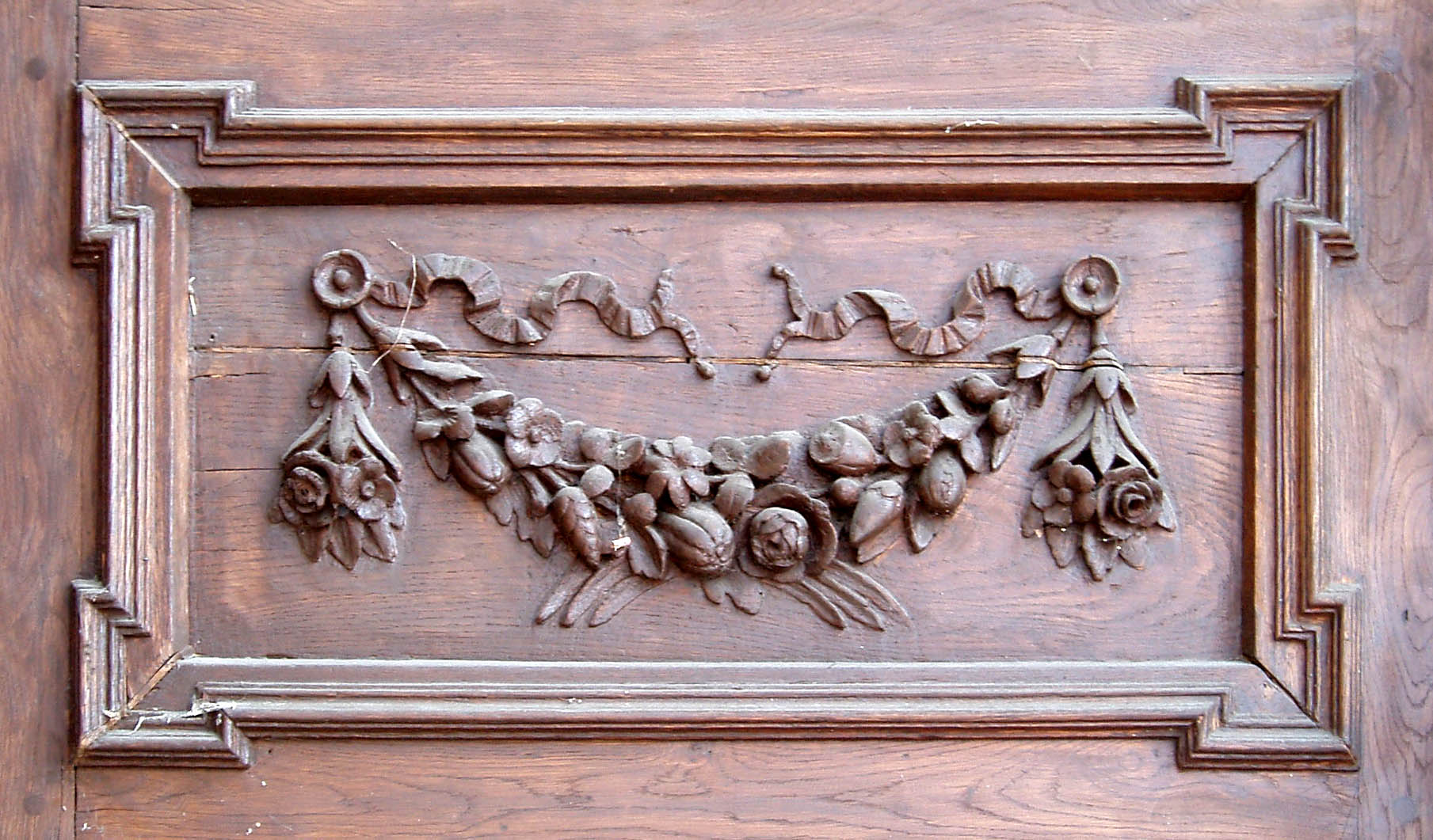
A festoon, a widely used ornament in Ancient Greek, Roman, Baroque and Neoclassical

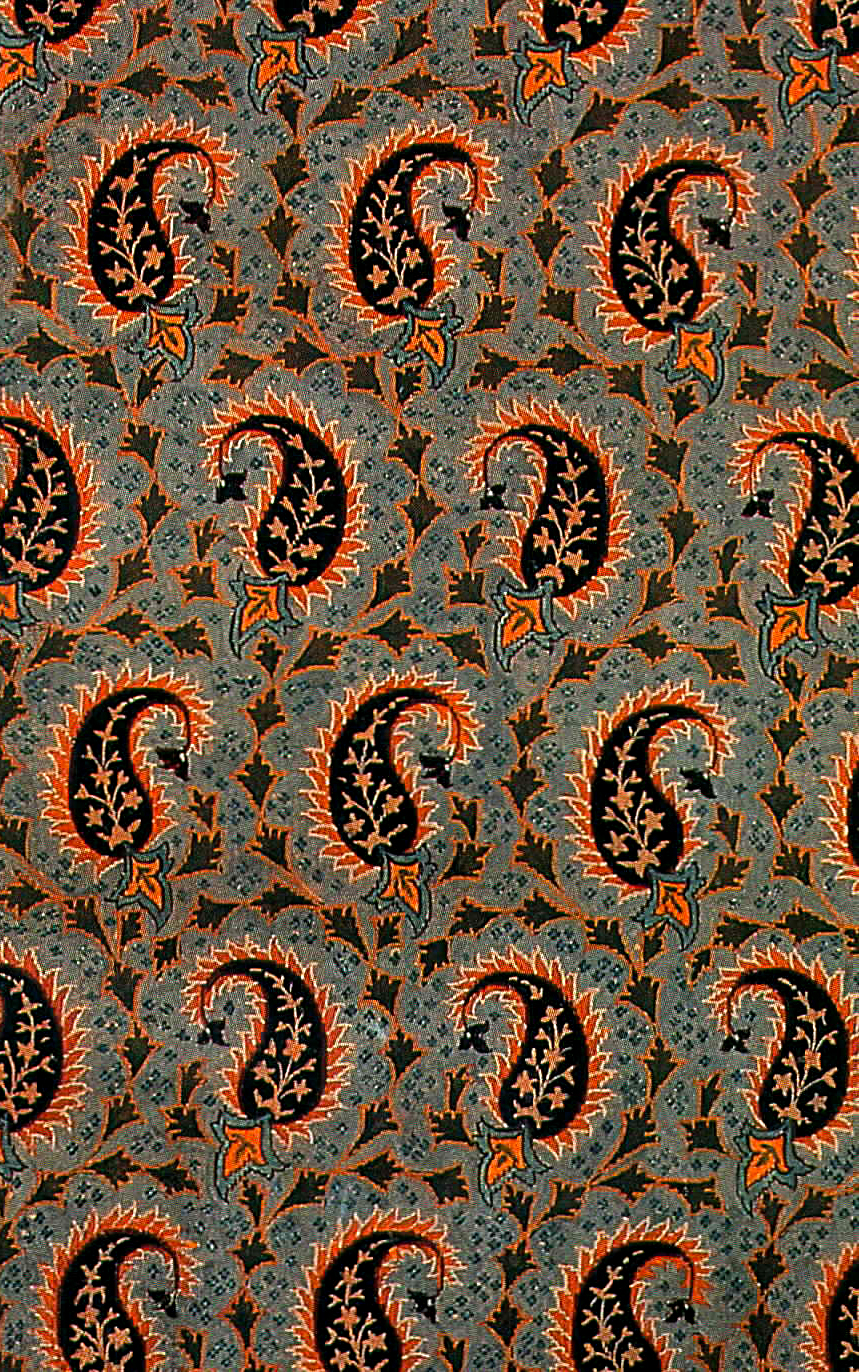
Paisley (design).

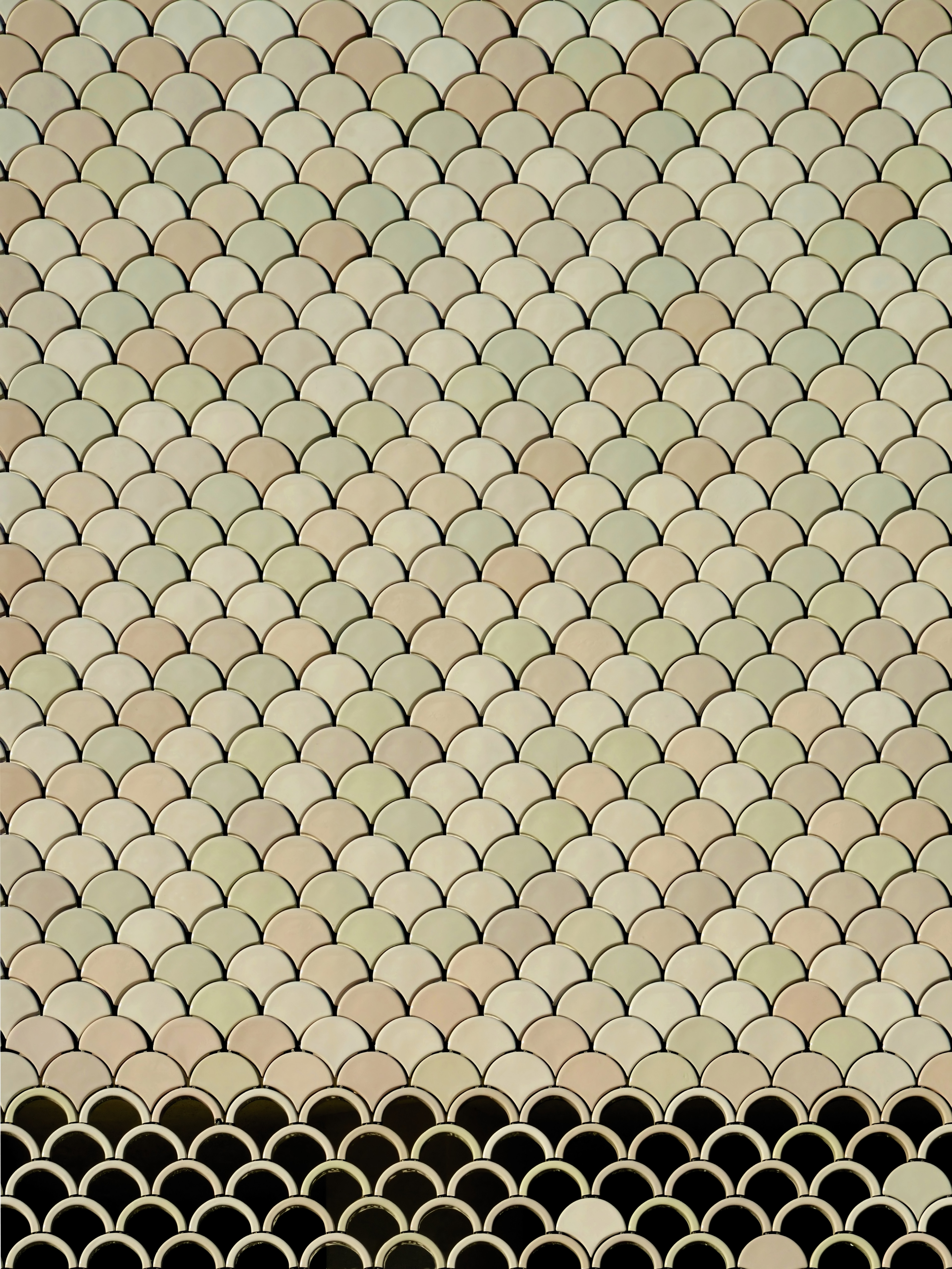
On a building in the Parque das Nações in Lisbon.

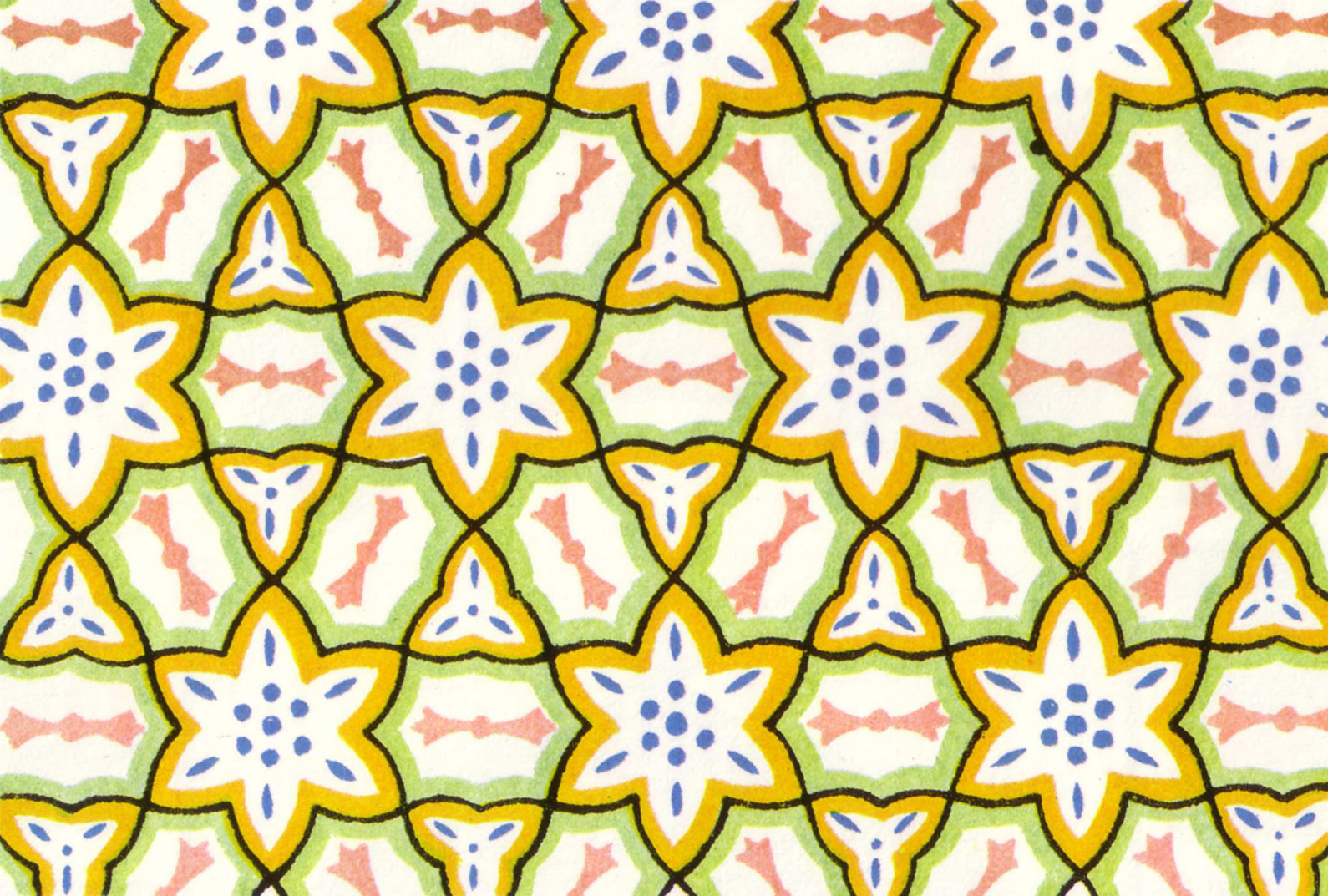
Illustration from The Grammar of Ornament (1856).

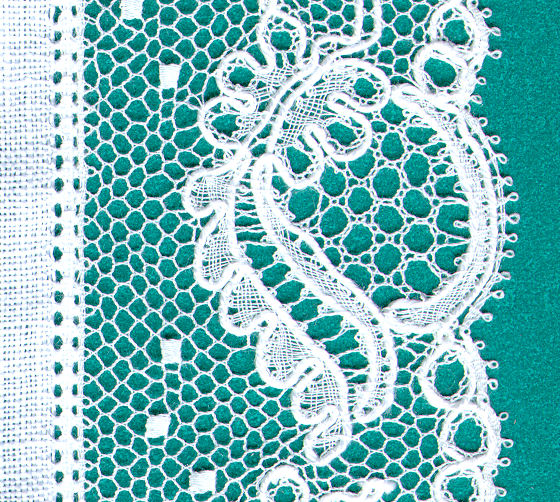
Motif in lace.

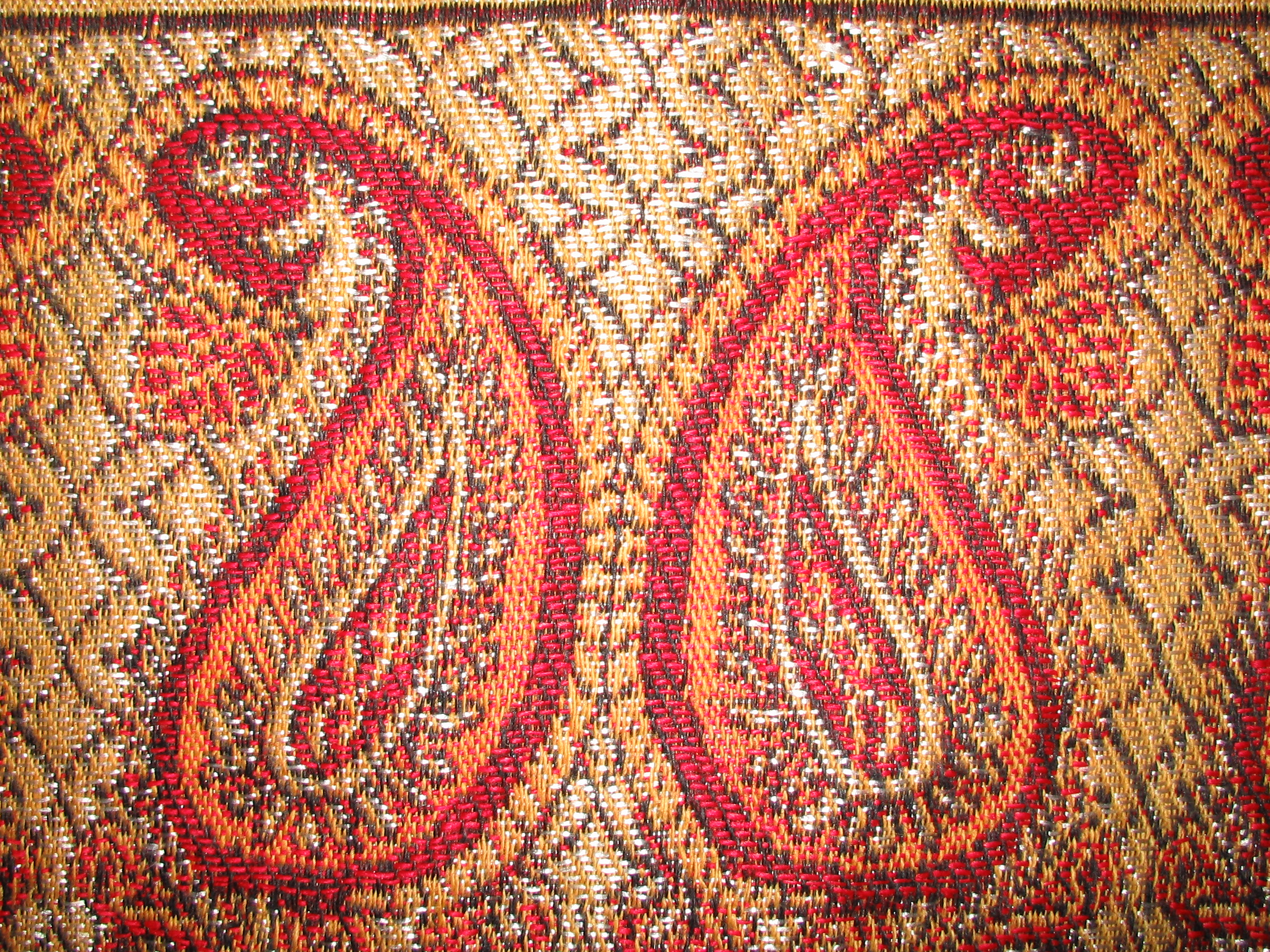
Persian motif in textile.

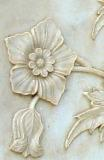
Motif of a plant, Taj Mahal

== See also ==
- Three hares
