= Barkat =

Barkat is a Punjab or Pakistani surname and a given name. Notable persons with that name include:

== Persons with the given name ==
- Barkat Gourad Hamadou (born 1930), Djibouti politician and Prime Minister
- Barkat Siddiqui, Pakistani television director, producer and actor
- Barkat Sidhu (1946–2014), Indian Punjabi singer
- Barkat Virani, Indian Gujarati author and poet

== Persons with the surname ==
- Abul Barkat (1927–1952), Bengali-Pakistani demonstrator killed during protests
- Abul Barkat (economist) (born 1954), Bangladeshi economist and professor
- Alona Barkat (born 1969), Israeli businesswoman and football team owner
- Behzad Barkat, Iranian translator and professor
- Nir Barkat (born 1959), Israeli businessman, entrepreneur, philanthropist; two-term mayor of Jerusalem
- Reuven Barkat (1906–1972), Israeli politician
- Sidi Mohamed Barkat (born 1948), Algerian philosopher
- Waqas Barkat (born 1990), Pakistani-born Hong Kong cricketer

== See also ==
- Barkat Ali, male Muslim given name
- Shaheed Barkat Stadium, Gazipur, Bangladesh
- Barakat (disambiguation)
- Bereket (disambiguation)
