= Verni (kilim) =

- Type: Flat-woven textile (Kilim)
- Material: Wool, goat hair, sometimes silk

The verni, sometimes called the needle rug, is a type of sumak woven without reference to a pattern by the girls and women of the Shahsevan and Arasbaran nomads.

Many historical tombstones in the Arasbaran region, such as the historical tombstones in Anjerd village (Ahar County) and As village (Kalibar County), have designs of verni weaving. Many of the historical tombstones of Arsbaran region, such as the historical tombstones of Anjard village (Ahar city) and As village (Kalibar city) have verni-bafi designs.

Verni is a kind of one-sided or pile-like rug and is shaped and patterned in the way of twisted weaving, that is, the main weft is passed through the warp and the worm thread is wrapped around the warp threads. The difference between carpet and varnish is that in carpet, the weave is done in the form of interrupted knots and its patterns are formed by the weft, and the warp is completely covered by the weft, while in varnish weaving, the design and patterns on its surface are created with additional texture, and the warp and weft are both covered. The extra weft, called the main weft, does not simply pass through the warps like the carpet weft, but has an alternating circular motion around the warp.

The most common uses of verni include baskets, mats (folding mats) and carpets, which are often woven on vertical looms in sizes of 1.3 x 1 m and 1.5 x 1 m.

Verni's overall design consists of three components: border, text and trng (göl means pond). The main decorative feature is the S element, which is sometimes displayed as an S or 5. This element instills the concept of dragons in nomadic culture. Verni weavers use motifs such as deer, deer, wolf, herd dog, turkey, chicken and rooster, jackal, robin, local birds, etc. in a very beautiful and geometrical way.

The main place of varnish production was the Karabagh region, especially the city of Shamkhi. Due to the cultural and tribal ties and traffic on both sides of the Aras River, verni production gradually became common first in the Arasbaran region and then among the tribes and nomads of the Moghan Plain. Currently, more than 20,000 people in the region, especially in Ahar city, are engaged in varnish production and earn a living from its production.
