= Barakat =

Barakat (Arabic: بركات) is an Arabic word meaning blessings. It may refer to:

== Persons ==
- Barakat (surname)
- Barkatullah (disambiguation), a male given name

== Others ==
- Barakat syndrome, also known as HDR syndrome
- Barakat!, 2006 French-Algerian film, directed by Djamila Sahraoui
- Barakat (2020 film), a South African drama film
- al-Barakat, Somali consortium
- Barakat, Inc., an American NGO working in India, Pakistan, and Afghanistan

== See also ==
- Berakhah (Birkath-)
- Baraka (disambiguation)
- Barak (disambiguation)
- Barka (disambiguation)
- Bereket (disambiguation)
- Bereket (name)
- Barack Obama
- COVIran Barekat
