= Bereket (disambiguation) =

Bereket is a city in western Turkmenistan, formerly known as Kazandjik or Gazandjyk.

Bereket may also refer to:

- Bereket (name)
- Bereket, Burdur
- Bereket, Gülnar, a village in Mersin Province of Turkey
- Bereket, Kurşunlu
- Bereket District, a district of Balkan Province in Turkmenistan
- Bereket, a Kilim motif symbolising fertility

== See also ==
- Barakat (disambiguation)
- Barkat, a surname and given name
- Bereketli (disambiguation)
