= Barkatullah =

Barkatullah or Barakatullah is a male Muslim given name and surname composed of the elements Barakat and Allah, meaning blessings of God. it may refer to

== People ==
- Mohamed Barakatullah Bhopali (1854–1927), anti-British Indian revolutionary
- Mohammad Barkatullah (author) (1898–1974), Bangladeshi author
- Barkatullah Khan (1920–1973), Indian politician
- Barkatullah (archdeacon) (1891–1960), Christian apologist
- Mohammad Barkatullah (producer) (1940s–2020), Bangladeshi television producer
- Bijori Barkatullah, Bangladeshi actress

== Others ==
- Barkatullah University, Indian university named after a freedom fighter
