= Pakudos =

Symbol of the Mangyan peoples

A pakudos symbol

A pakudos is a visual motif used by the Hanunuo Mangyan people of Mindoro in the Philippines. Pakudos are characterized by symmetrical, aesthetic, and orderly utilization of lines and space with equal utilization of vertical and horizontal composition. The word pakudos was coined from cruz, the Spanish word for cross. The pakudos motif is a common element in Mangyan embroidery and crafts. It is also featured on the official seal of San Jose, Occidental Mindoro.

== Description ==
This design element is added in various modern products such as bags, baskets, bracelets, jars and clothing. It can also be made into a tattoo or as an art project like sculptures, houses, and bamboo craft. Ethnic clothing of both men and women are embroidered with pakudos as well as bracelets, necklaces, and blankets called banig in order to wade off evil spirits and bad luck.

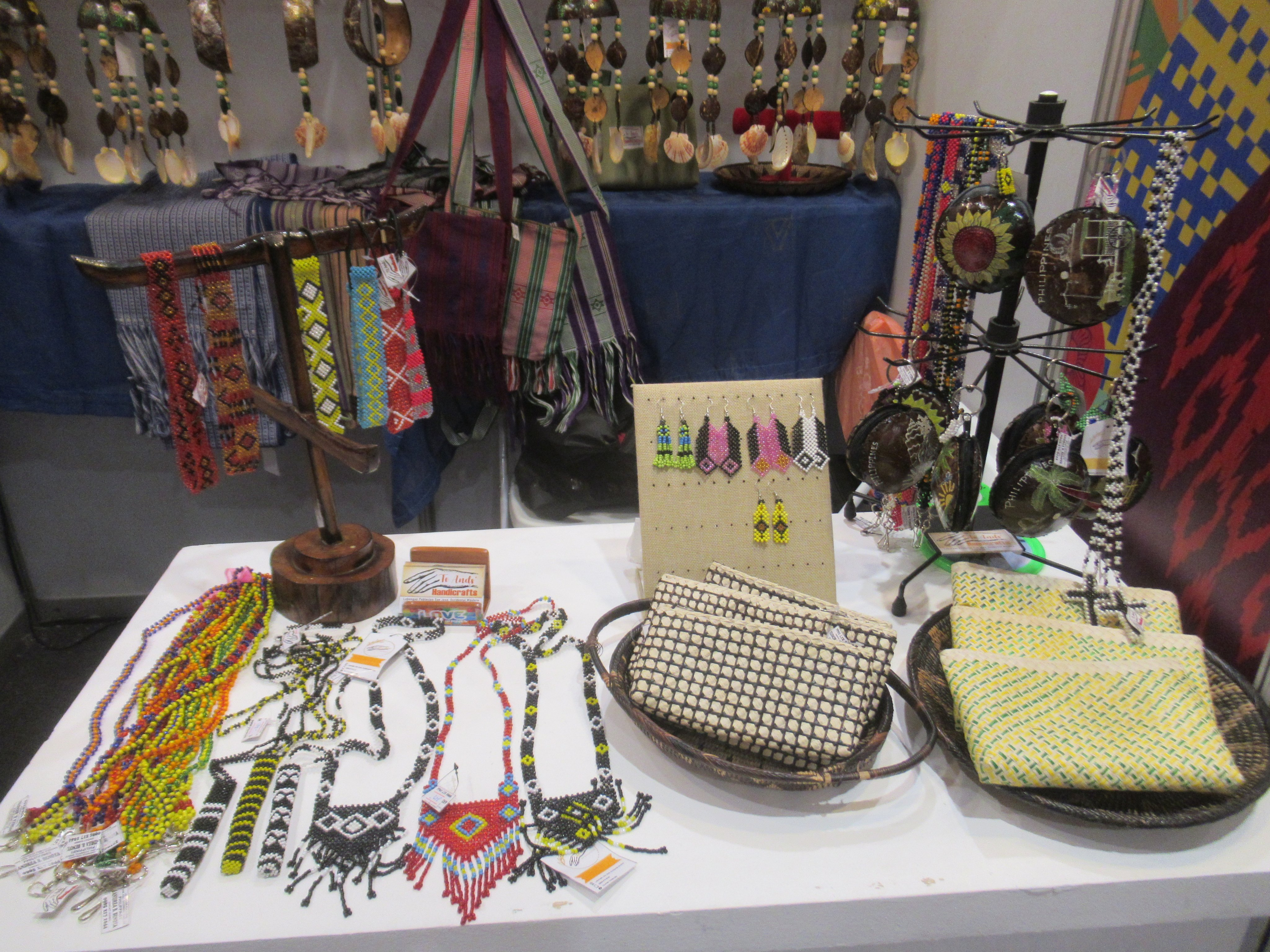
San Jose, Occidental Mindoro Mangyan inspired-visual motif

== Heritage ==
The Mangyan Heritage Center located in Calapan, Mindoro collaborates and advocates traditional weaving patterns and embellished style to mainstream arts & crafts.
