= Bereketli =

Bereketli (Turkish and Turkmen for "fertile" or "plentiful") may refer to:

- Bereketli, Ağlı
- Bereketli, Besni
- Bereketli, Ergani
- Bereketli, İdil
- Bereketli, Karacasu
- Bereketli, Nazilli
- Bereketli, Reşadiye
- Bereketli, Şenkaya
- Bereketli, Silvan
- Bereketli Garagum Nature Reserve

== See also ==
- Bereket (disambiguation)
