= Soumak =

Type of cloth

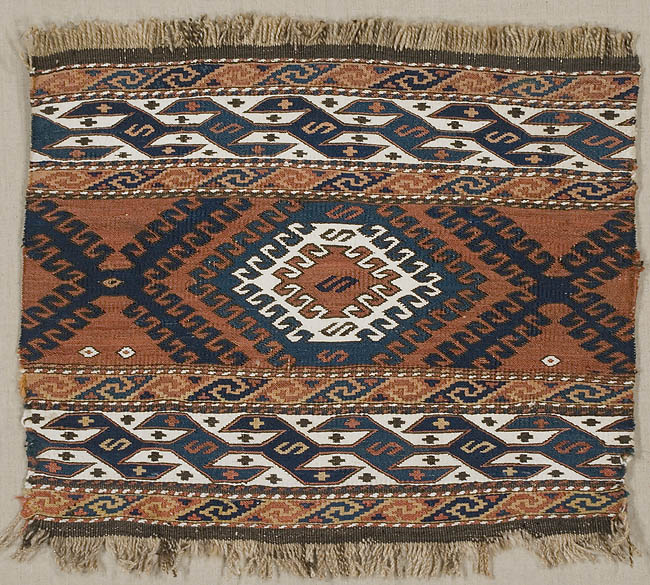
Soumak Mafrash (bedding bag) panel, from Borchali, Georgia, late 19th century. The pattern includes motifs used on kilims, such as the eye, cross, and hook, to ward off the evil eye; the central diamond-shaped motif represents a dragon.

Soumak (also spelled soumakh, sumak, sumac, or soumac) is a tapestry technique of weaving sturdy, decorative fabrics used for carpets, rugs, domestic bags and bedding, with soumak fabrics used for bedding known as soumak mafrash.

Soumak is a type of flat weave, somewhat resembling kilim, but with a stronger and thicker weave, a smooth front face and a ragged back, where kilim is smooth on both sides. Soumak lacks the slits characteristic of kilim, as it is usually woven with supplementary weft threads as continuous supports.

The technique involves wrapping coloured weft threads over and under the warp threads, adding strength and embroidery-like pattern.

== Etymology ==
The name 'soumak' may plausibly derive from the old town of Shemakja in Azerbaijan, once a major trading centre in the Eastern Caucasus. Other theories include an etymology from Turkish 'sekmek', 'to skip up and down', meaning the process of weaving; or from any of about 35 species of flowering plant in the Anacardiaceae or sumac family, such as dyer's sumach (Cotinus coggygria), used to make dyestuffs. If this last is the source of the name, then it is derived from the Arabic and Syriac word 'summāq', meaning 'red'.

== Technique ==
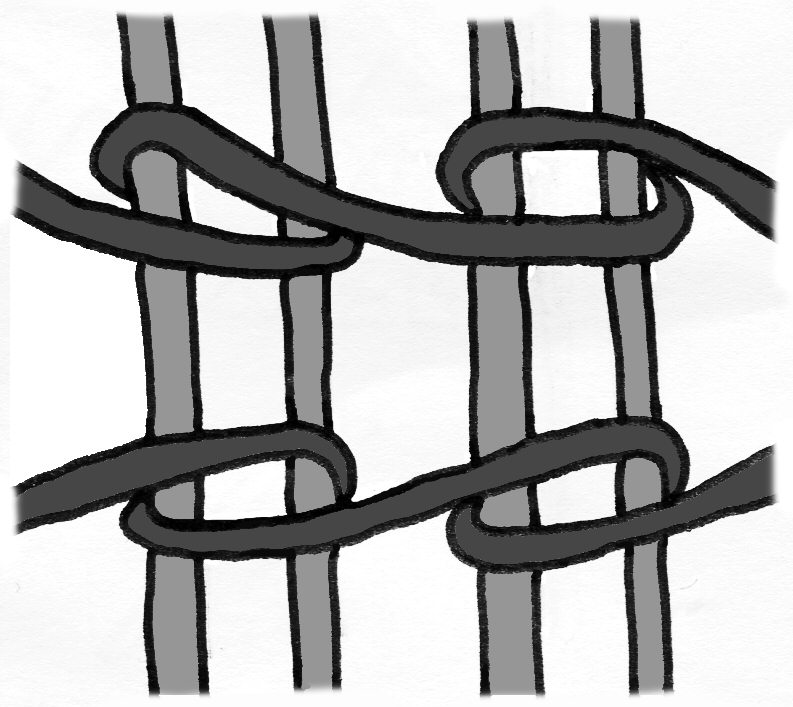
Soumak weave wraps the weft threads over 4 warps and back over 2. The weaver may sometimes, as here, go backwards and forwards, reversing the direction of the wrapping.

The technique of making a soumak involves wrapping wefts over a certain number of warps (usually 4) before drawing them back under the last two warps. The process is repeated from selvedge to selvedge. The wefts are discontinuous; the weaver selects coloured threads in turn, and wraps each within the area which is to have that particular colour. Unlike kilim, the back is left ragged, with all the loose ends of the differently-coloured weft threads visible, sometimes several inches long, providing extra thickness and warmth. Also unlike kilim, there are no slits where colours meet, as there is a supplementary or structural weft which supports the coloured pattern weft. Some late Soumaks made by the Kurds are however "weftless", lacking the structural weft support, and the stitches naturally overlap.

Soumaks tend to be finely woven, and although not as durable as piled carpets, they are stronger than kilims. The soumak wrapping often covers the whole surface of a bag or rug, but it can equally be applied in decorative strips, contrasting with the plainer and thinner flatweave areas. For example, camel bags from Malatya in Eastern Turkey could be woven in simple flatweave stripes of red and blue, with broad strips of soumak weft-wrapping with motifs for fertility and protection.

Bags were sometimes woven with a face of soumak, with a tapestry-woven kilim-like top creating slits between blocks of colour: a rope was threaded in and out of the series of slits to fasten and close the bag. Sizes vary, from carpet format through bags for bedding or for use on pack animals, to tiny tribal domestic bags. The following images show the appearance and construction of just such a soumak saddle bag, woven in Luristan at the end of the 20th century. The Lurs sometimes, as here, combine soumak and knotted carpet pile to adorn a single piece. To form the motifs, the weaver may push the weft threads about to form curves or slanting shapes as desired.

Soumak saddle bag, Luristan, late 20th century

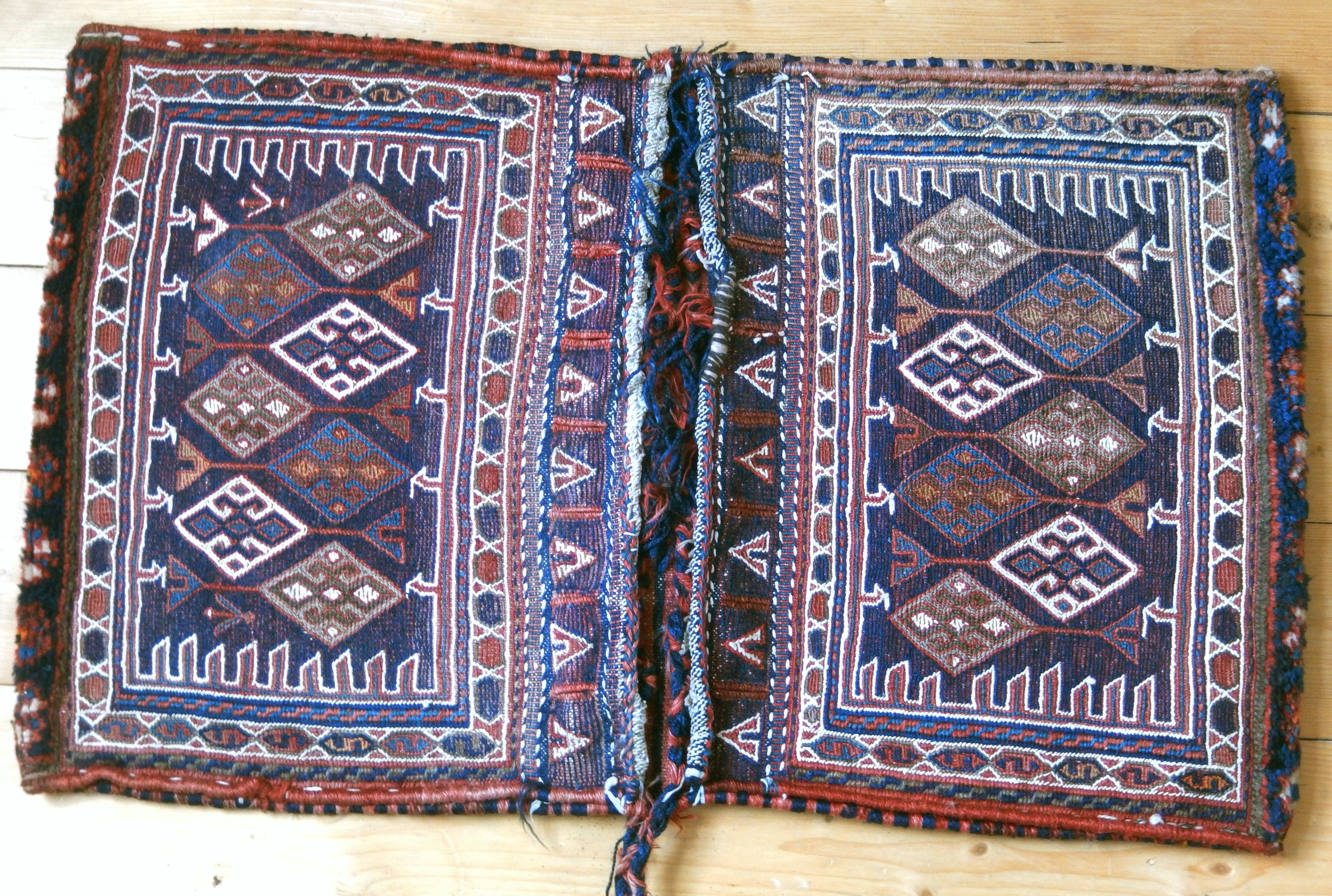
Front

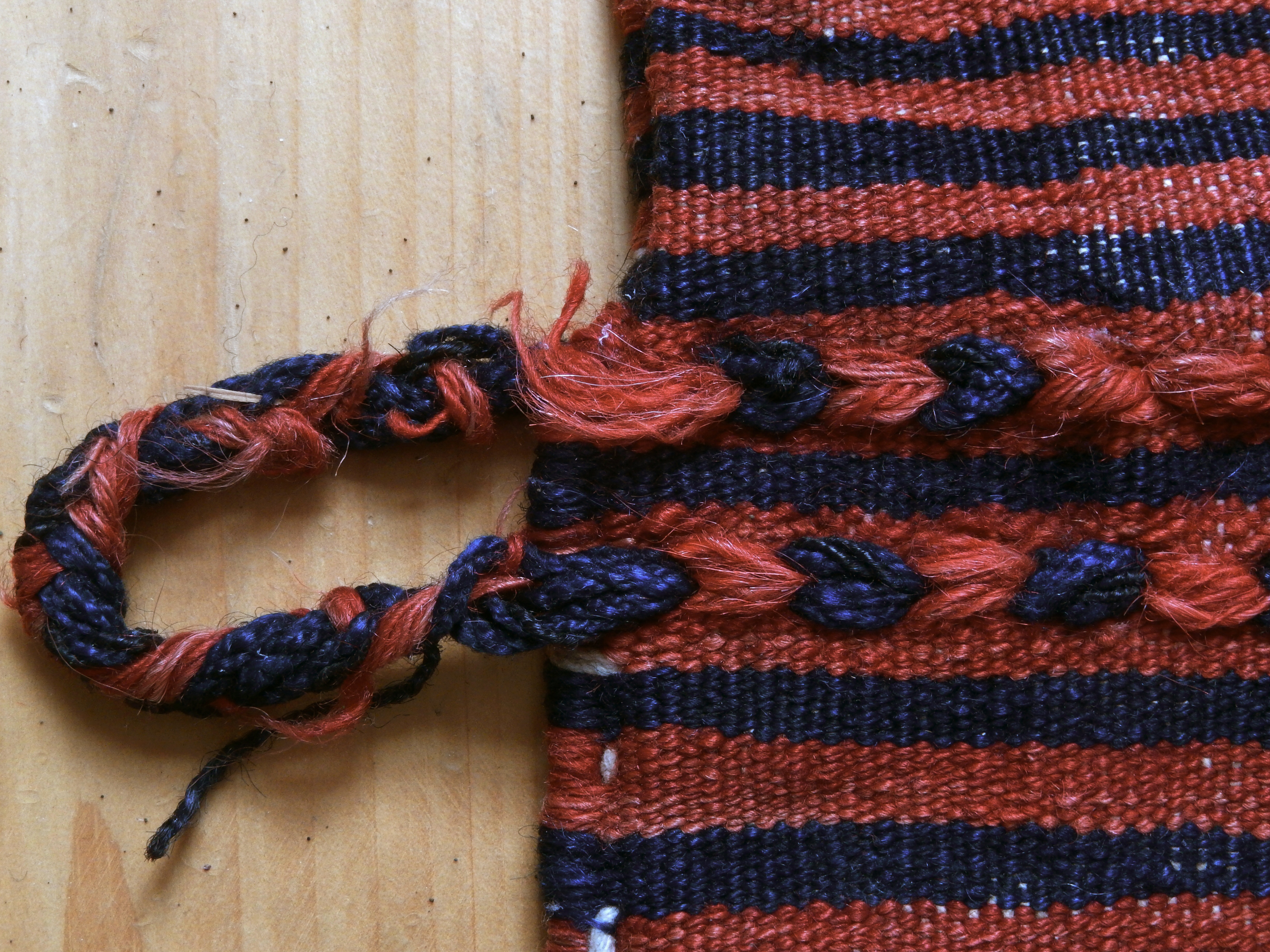
Detail of woollen handle

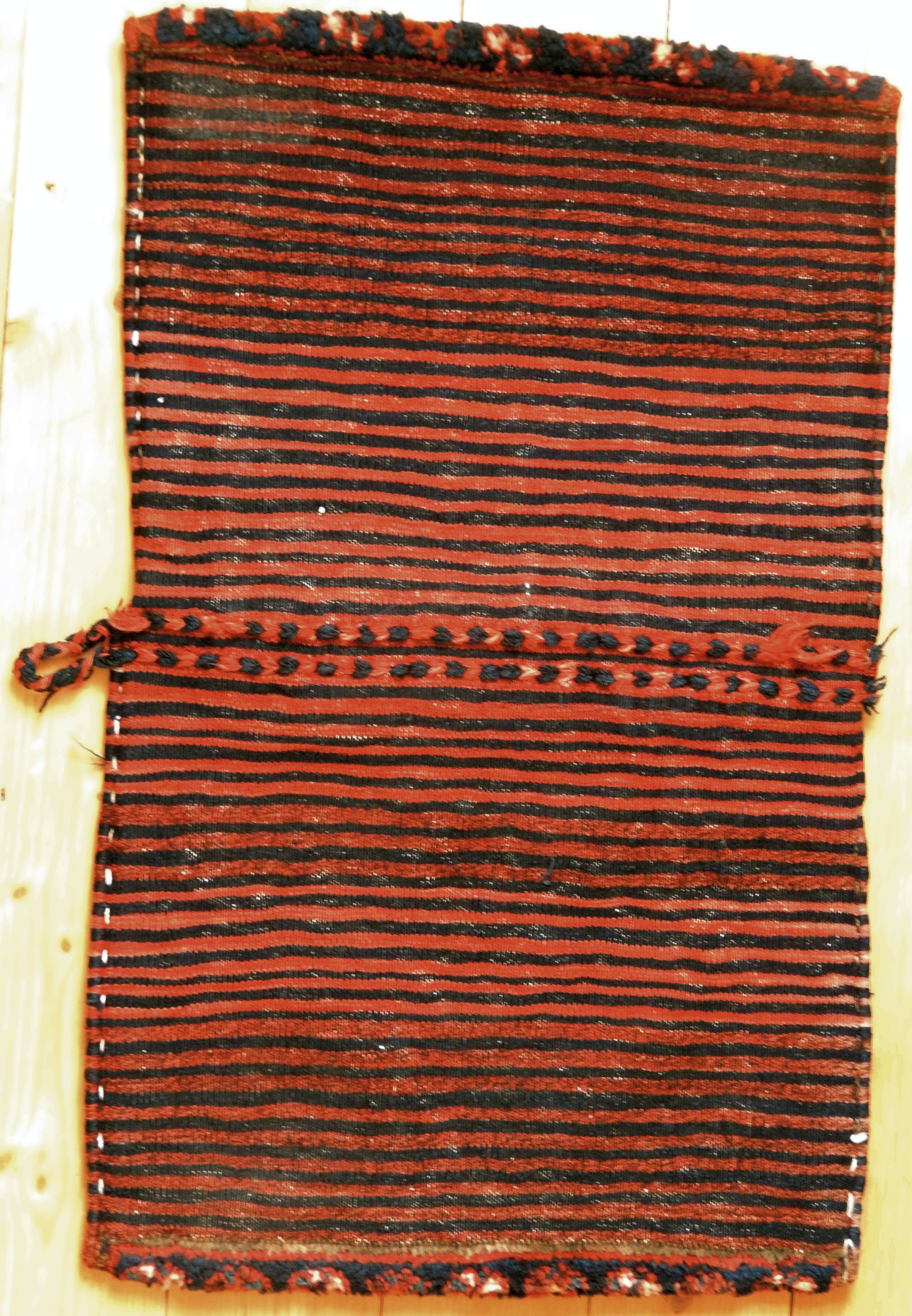
Simple red and blue striped rear, without weft wrapping

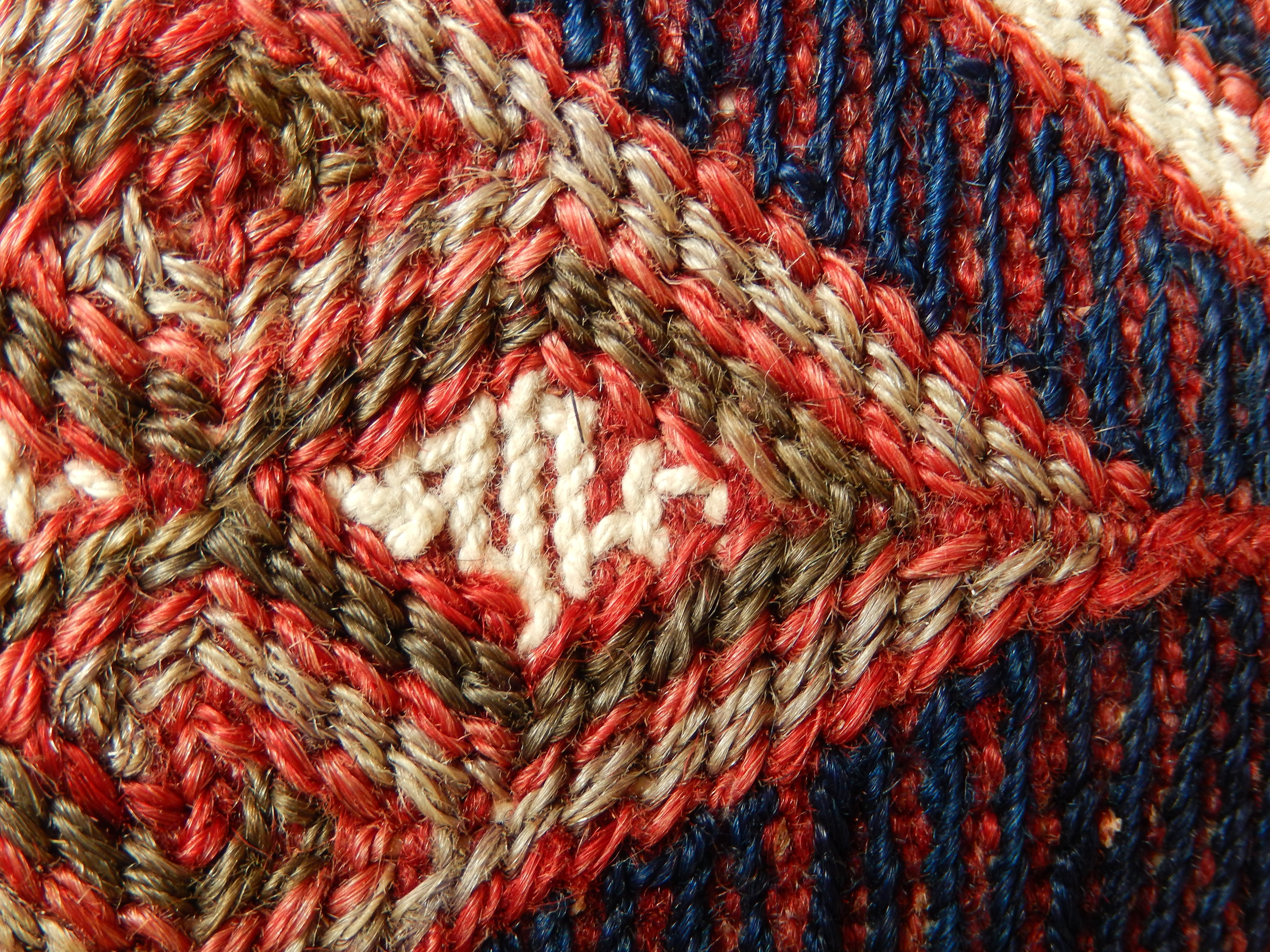
Detail of weft wrapping: "weft yarns .. can be pushed about as the weaver wishes"

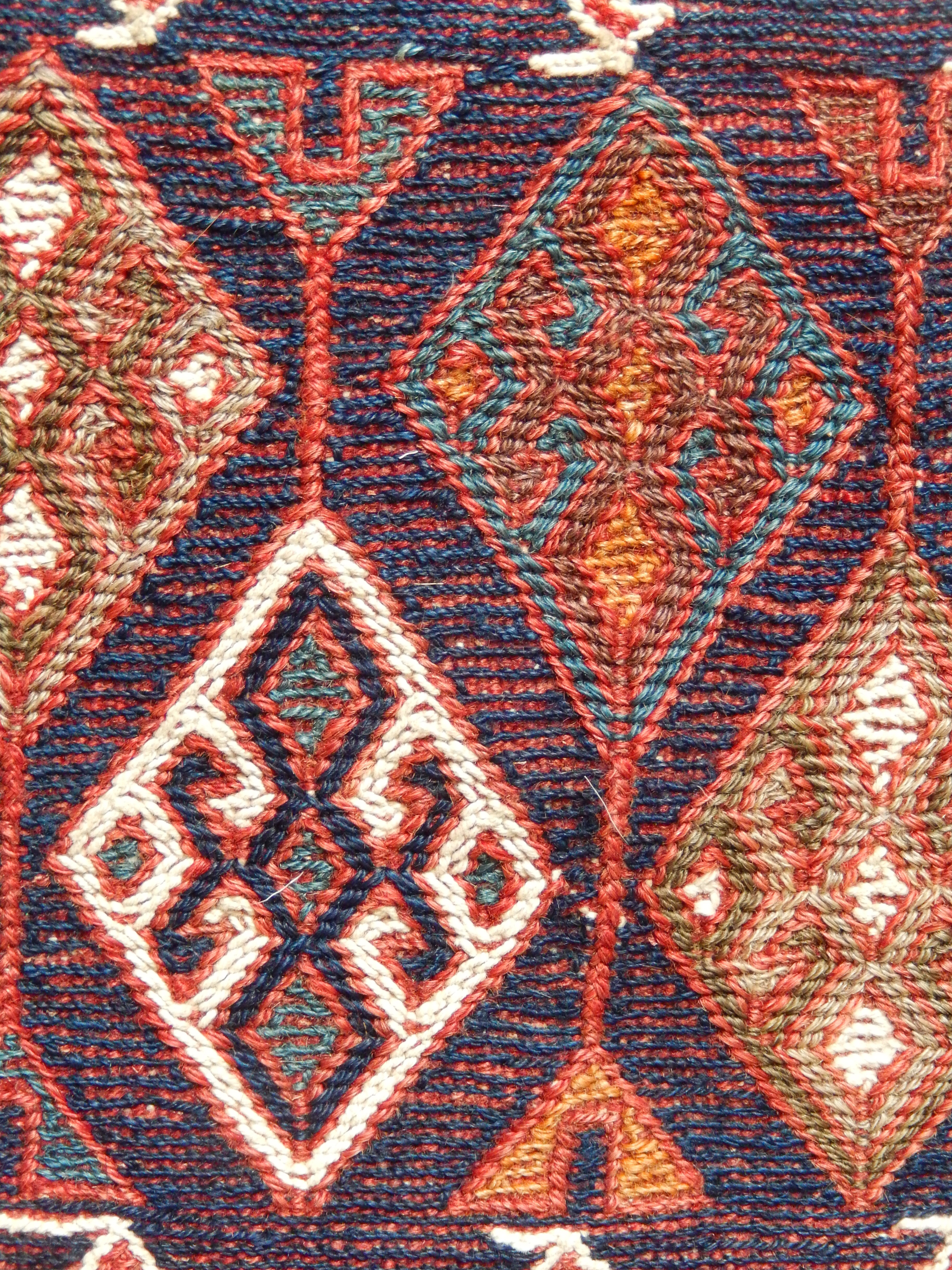
Detail of motif on front

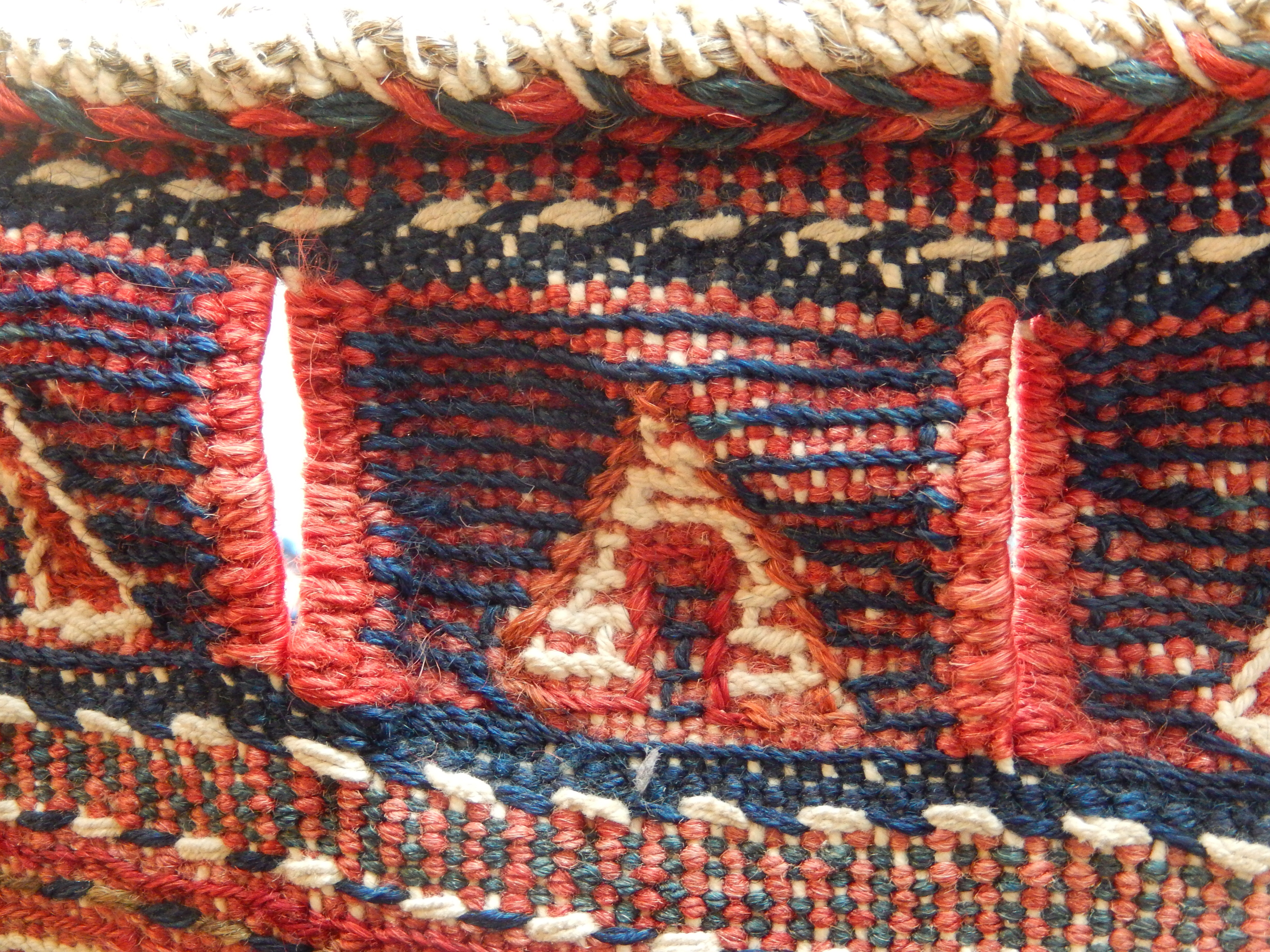
Detail of decorative border, with slits for rope to close and secure bag

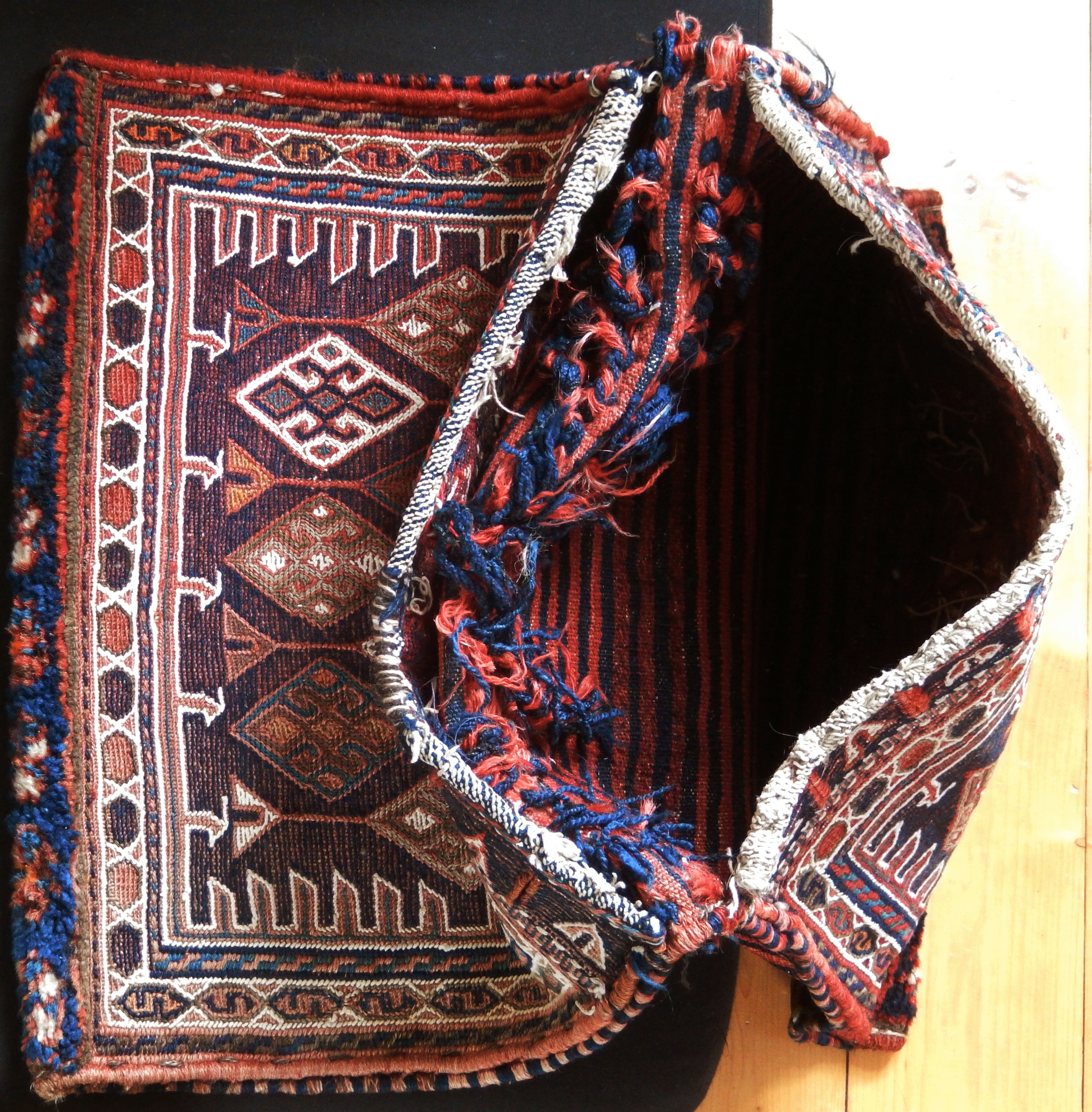
Saddle bag shown open one side

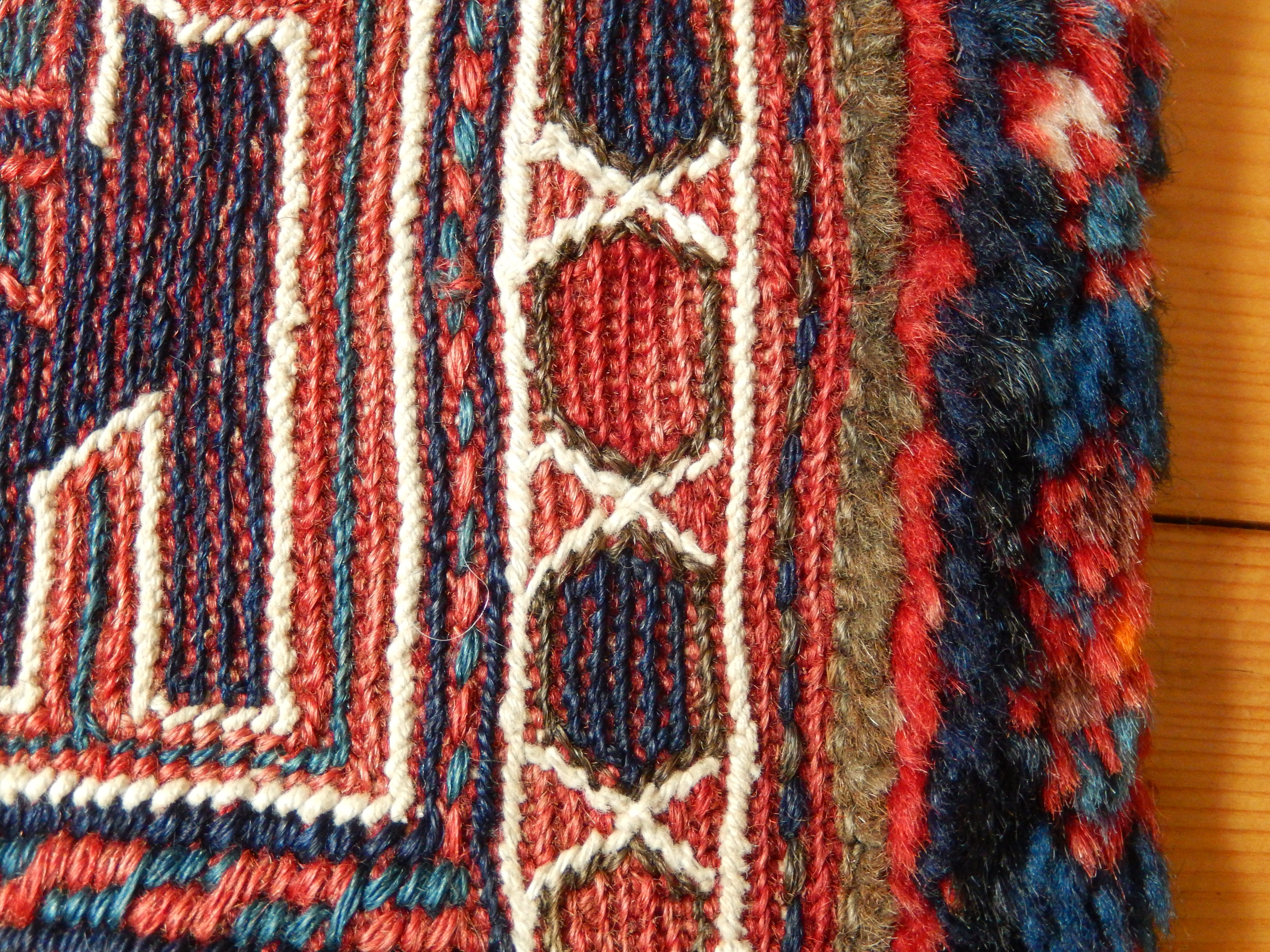
Detail of edge with narrow strip of pile carpet (right)

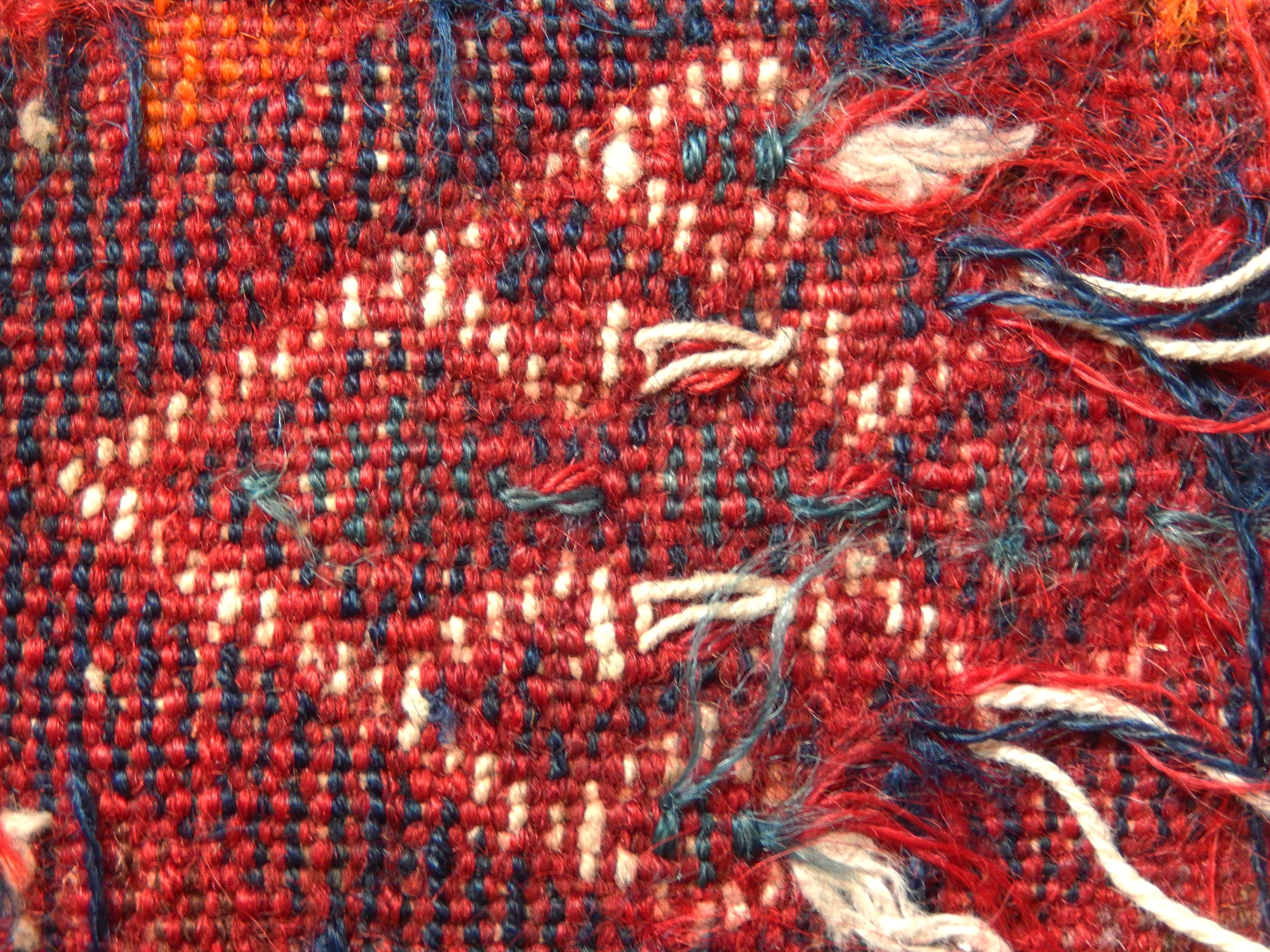
Detail of reverse showing ragged ends of weft threads of different colours

== Regions ==
Soumak products are made in the Caucasus (especially the Shirvan region), Southern and Western Persia including Luristan, Turkish Anatolia, by the Shahsavan tribe and the Kurds in north-western Persia, and by the Baloch people on the Persia–Afghanistan border.
