= Elibelinde =

Turkish motif of a hands-on-hips female figure

Elibelinde (Turkish for "hands on hips") is a Turkish motif of a hands-on-hips female figure. It is widely used on kilims (flat tapestry-woven carpets) and occurs in many variations. The arms of the figure are represented by two inward-facing hooks, while the body of the woman is represented by a triangle or diamond, sometimes with a child depicted in the womb.The head is typically represented by a diamond. The Elibelinde is a symbol of fertility and motherhood. It is one of many kilim motifs commonly woven into Turkish flatweave rugs. The motif may appear in single form and also in mirror images in either the field or the borders of the Kilim rug.
