= Bereket (name) =

Bereket is both a given name and a surname of Arabic and Ge'ez origin. Notable people with the name include:

== Given name ==
- Bereket Mengisteab (1938–2025), Eritrean singer-songwriter
- Bereket Selassie (born 1932), Eritrean academic
- Bereket Simon, Ethiopian politician

== Surname ==
- Adem Bereket (born 1973), Turkish wrestler

== See also ==
- Bereket (disambiguation)
- Bereket, Japanese independent Record label run by Phew (singer)
