= Barakat, Inc. =

Non-governmental organization

Current logo.

Barakat, Inc. is a non-governmental organization doing humanitarian work in Afghanistan, Pakistan, and India. With a small office in the United States and a number of contacts on the ground in the aforementioned three countries, Barakat holds to the mission of bringing progressive social change to South and Central Asian communities even when that change is locally controversial.

== Etymology ==
The term “Barakat” is used universally in Arabic, Turkic, and Persian languages often as a salutation. In Arabic, it is the plural form of "Barak" and commonly translated as "blessings". Specifically, "Barakat" refers to blessings or a divinely inspired guidance. This guidance or influence may be found among persons, places, things, and actions.

== Beginnings ==
Barakat began as a partnership between a carpet-weaving business based in Punjab, Pakistan and a carpet-selling business based in Cambridge, Massachusetts. The two founders, Habibullah Karimi, an Afghan refugee living in Pakistan, and Chris Walters, an American small-business owner, decided to reinvest their profits back into the communities where they have been working, in order to promote education, particularly for women and girls.

Barakat originally wanted to open its first school in Afghanistan, but the Soviet withdrawal and following the Afghan Civil War left the country in too much turmoil to make this possible. Instead, Walter and Karimi turned their efforts to Attock City, in Northern Pakistan, where a large number of Afghan refugees had settled, and began work on the first of the now three schools Barakat has in the country. When the Taliban was finally overthrown, Barakat moved into Afghanistan where it currently operates two schools and home-based literacy programs for girls and women who cannot attend formal school. Barakat, Inc. was formally registered as a US nonprofit in 2000.

== Current work ==
Today, Barakat has grown from one school in Pakistan into an organization spread across two countries, serving more than 3,000 women and children each year. One of its foremost projects is a program of girl's and women's literacy courses in the Faryab and Jowzjan provinces of Afghanistan, where female opportunities in education tend to be limited.
