= Behzad Barkat =

Iranian literary professor

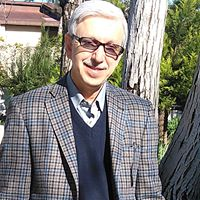
- Born: 1955 (age 70–71); Tehran, Iran
- Occupations: Translator and Writer. University Professor

Behzad Barkat (in Persian: بهزاد برکت) is an Iranian University Professor of Literature and Linguistics at Guilan University, and a translator. He is the author and translator of quite a number of books and articles. He also teaches at Rasht, Azad university. His classes are held in Persian and English, and his PhD dissertation was written and published in French.

== Education ==
Barkat received his BA in English Literature from Kharazmi (Tarbiat Moallem) University, followed by a Master of Arts degree in General Linguistics from the University of Tehran. He was later granted a scholarship to study for his doctorate in France, at INALCO, and majored in 2004 in comparative literature/translation studies.
