= Barkatullah (archdeacon) =

Indian Christian Urdu writer

Allama Barkatullah
- Born: 1891; Narowal, British Raj
- Died: 1971 (aged 79–80)
- Education: Master's degree in Philosophy
- Religion: Shia Muslim → Christianity
- Church: Church of England
- Offices held: Diocese of Amritsar
- Title: Archdeacon

Barkatullah (also spelt as Barakatullah or Barkat Ullah) was a Christian apologist and a convert from Islam. He was baptised at the age of 16 years on 7 July 1907. He worked as a lecturer in Edwardes College, and Forman Christian College from 1914 until his ordination in 1923. He also served in the Henry Martyn School of Islamic Studies in Aligarh after his retirement in 1956. He has authored several Urdu volumes in his contribution to the Christian apologetics. He was also the member of the Royal Asiatic Society. He died in 1971.
