= Kilim motifs =

Symbolic elements of flat-woven rugs

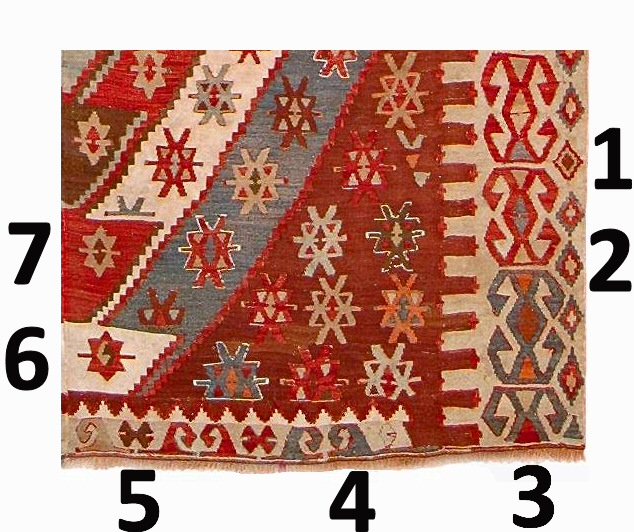
Detail of an antique vegetable-dyed Konya Kilim, numbered to identify motifs (Turkish names in parentheses): 1) Eye (Göz) / Evil Eye (Nazarlık) 2) Eye, containing Cross (Haç) 3) Ram's Horn (Koçboynuzu) 4) Fertility (Bereket) 5) Wolf's Mouth (Kurt İzi) 6) Star (Yıldız), containing Love and Unison (Aşk ve Birleşim) 7) Star, containing Fetter (Bukaǧı)

Many motifs are used in traditional kilims, handmade flat-woven rugs, each with many variations. In Turkish Anatolia in particular, village women wove themes significant for their lives into their rugs, whether before marriage or during married life. Some motifs represent desires, such as for happiness and children; others, for protection against threats such as wolves (to the flocks) and scorpions, or against the evil eye. These motifs were often combined when woven into patterns on kilims. With the fading of tribal and village cultures in the 20th century, the meanings of kilim patterns have also faded.

In these tribal societies, women wove kilims at different stages of their lives, choosing themes appropriate to their own circumstances. Some of the motifs used are widespread across Anatolia and sometimes across other regions of West Asia, but patterns vary between tribes and villages, and rugs often expressed personal and social meaning.

== Context ==
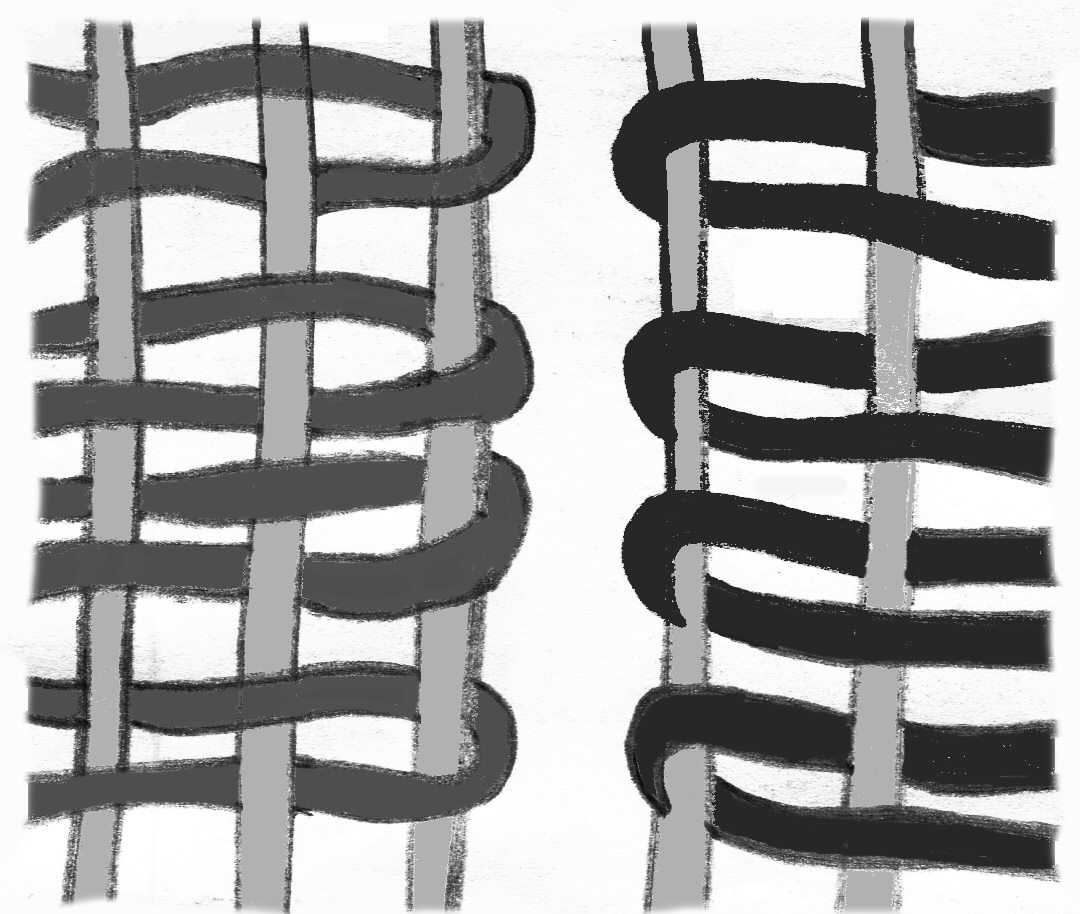
Diagram of Kilim slit weave technique, showing how the weft threads of each colour are wound back from the colour boundary, leaving a slit

A Turkish kilim is a flat-woven rug from Anatolia. Although the name kilim is sometimes used loosely in the West to include all type of rug such as cicim, palaz, soumak and zili, in fact any type other than pile carpets, the name kilim properly denotes a specific weaving technique. Cicim, palaz, soumak and zili are made using three groups of threads, namely longitudinal warps, crossing wefts, and wrapping coloured threads. The wrapping threads give these rugs additional thickness and strength. Kilim in contrast are woven flat, using only warp and weft threads. Kilim patterns are created by winding the weft threads, which are coloured, backwards and forwards around pairs of warp threads, leaving the resulting weave completely flat. Kilim are therefore called flatweave or flatware rugs.

To create a sharp pattern, weavers usually end each pattern element at a particular thread, winding the coloured weft threads back around the same warps, leaving a narrow gap or slit. These are prized by collectors for the crispness of their decoration. The motifs on kilims woven in this way are constrained to be somewhat angular and geometric.

In tribal societies, kilim were woven by women at different stages of their lives: before marriage, in readiness for married life; while married, for her children; and finally, kilim for her own funeral, to be given to the mosque. Kilims thus had strong personal and social significance in tribal and village cultures, being made for personal and family use. Feelings of happiness or sorrow, hopes and fears were expressed in the weaving motifs. Many of these represent familiar household and personal objects, such as a hairband, a comb, an earring, a trousseau chest, a jug, a hook.

== Meanings ==
The Elibelinde or hands-on-hips motif is a stylized female figure, symbolizing motherhood and fertility.

The meanings expressed in kilims derive both from the individual motifs used, and by their pattern and arrangement in the rug as a whole. A few symbols are widespread across Anatolia as well as other regions including Persia and the Caucasus; others are confined to Anatolia.

An especially widely used motif is the Elibelinde (hands on hips): Anatolian symbol of the mother goddess, mother with child in womb, fertility, and abundance. Other motifs express the tribal weavers' desires for protection of their families' flocks from wolves with the wolf's mouth or the wolf's foot motif (Turkish: Kurt Ağzı, Kurt İzi), or for safety from the sting of the scorpion (Turkish: Akrep). Several protective motifs, such as those for the dragon (Turkish: Ejder), scorpion, and spider (sometimes called the crab or tortoise by carpet specialists) share the same basic diamond shape with a hooked or stepped boundary, often making them very difficult to distinguish.

Several motifs hope for the safety of the weaver's family from the evil eye (Turkish: Nazarlık, also used as a motif), which could be divided into four with a cross symbol (Turkish: Haç), or averted with the symbol of a hook (Turkish: Çengel), a human eye (Turkish: Göz), or an amulet (Turkish: Muska; often, a triangular package containing a sacred verse). The carpet expert Jon Thompson explains that such an amulet woven into a rug is not a theme: to the weaver, it actually is an amulet, conferring protection by its presence. In his words, to people in the village and tribal cultures that wove kilims, "the device in the rug has a materiality, it generates a field of force able to interact with other unseen forces and is not merely an intellectual abstraction."

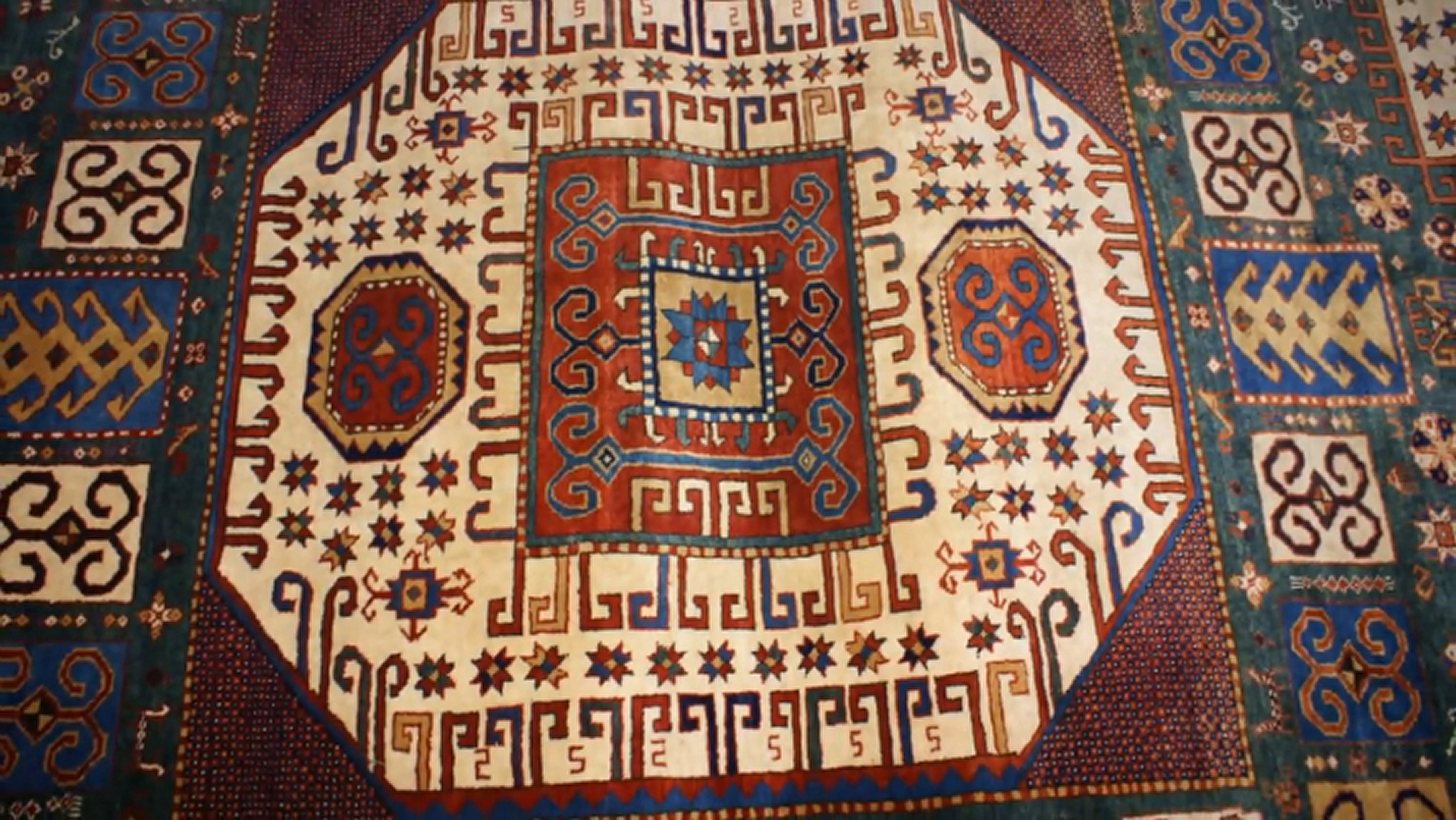
Similar motifs are sometimes used in pile carpets, such as the rows of Solomon's seal stars, rows of hooks, ram's horns, and hands-on-hips motifs in this Shirvan carpet from Azerbaijan.

Other motifs symbolised fertility, as with the trousseau chest motif (Turkish: Sandıklı), or the explicit fertility (Turkish: Bereket) motif. The motif for running water (Turkish: Su Yolu) similarly depicts the resource literally. The desire to tie a family or lovers together could be depicted with a fetter motif (Turkish: Bukağı). Similarly, a tombstone motif may indicate not simply death, but the desire to die rather than to part from the beloved. Several motifs represented the desire for good luck and happiness, as for instance the bird (Turkish: Kuş) and the star or Solomon's seal (Turkish: Yıldız). The oriental symbol of Yin/Yang is used for love and unison (Turkish: Aşk ve Birleşim). Among the motifs used late in life, the Tree of Life (Turkish: Hayat Ağacı) symbolizes the desire for immortality. Many of the plants used to represent the Tree of Life can also be seen as symbols of fruitfulness, fertility, and abundance. Thus the pomegranate, a tree whose fruits carry many seeds, implies the desire for many children.

Symbols are often combined, as when the feminine elibelinde and the masculine ram's horn are each drawn twice, overlapping at the centre, forming a figure (some variants of the Bereket or fertility motif) of the sacred union of the principles of the sexes.

== Motifs ==
All these motifs can vary considerably in appearance according to the weaver. Colours, sizes and shapes can all be chosen according to taste and the tradition in a given village or tribe; further, motifs are often combined, as illustrated in the photographs above. To give some idea of this variability, a few alternative forms are shown in the table.

Kilim motifs and their meanings
Name	Turkish	Motif	Purpose	Object	Notes
Hands-on-hips	Elibelinde		Fertility, motherhood	Marriage	Female principle (4 examples)
Cross	Haç		Protection	Evil eye	to divide the evil eye into four (2 examples)
Hook	Çengel		Protection	Evil eye	to destroy the evil eye
Eye	Göz		Protection	Evil eye	to ward off the evil eye (3 examples)
Comb	Tarak		Protection	Birth, marriage	May also symbolise rain, water of life (2 examples)
Running water	Su Yolu		Fresh water	Life	very important in tribal life (3 examples)
Fertility	Bereket		Fertility	Marriage	Combines female principle (hands-on-hips), male principle (ram's horn) (2 examples)
Ram's horn	Koçboynuzu		Fertility, Power, Masculinity	Marriage	Male principle (2 examples)
Star	Yıldız		Fertility, happiness	Marriage	Seal of Solomon was used by Phrygians in ancient Anatolia, alongside mother goddess, hence fertility.
Love and Unison	Aşk ve Birleşim		Love and harmony	Marriage	Derived from oriental Yin/Yang motif
Amulet	Muska		Protection; Luck	Evil eye	Amulets worn on the person contained a verse of scripture sewn into a square of cloth folded into a triangle. (3 examples)
Bird	Kuş		Luck, Happiness, strength, afterlife	Life, afterlife	Owl and raven signify bad luck; pigeon and nightingale, good luck. Also souls of the dead; expectation of news. (2 examples) It is said when the birds on the tree of life fly away, the soul is going to heaven. Vulture symbolizes death and souls of the dead.
Fetter	Bukaǧı		Union	Marriage	To tie family or lovers together in union The fetter tied front and hind legs of a goat. May also signify birth, the result of the union.
Trousseau chest	Sandıklı		Marriage, children	Marriage	Unmarried women prepared dowry in a chest.
Earring	Küpe		Marriage	—	A common wedding present
Wolf's Mouth, Wolf's Track	Kurt Ağzı, Kurt İzi		Protection of the flocks	Wolves	(2 examples)
Scorpion	Akrep		Protection	Scorpions	(2 examples). Similar motifs are used for other animals such as Spider, Crab and Dragon.
Dragon	Ejder		Fertility	-	Dragon is "master of air and water", cause of lunar eclipse, guard of treasure. (4 examples) Keeper of the tree of life and guardian of the secrets of the universe.
Tree of life	Hayat Ağacı		Immortality	-	Many different plants may be represented, e.g., beech, cypress, fig, oak, olive, palm, pomegranate, vine
Burdock	Pitrak		Protection, abundance	Evil eye	Plant that produces burrs that stick to everything and which is used to ward off evil eye. With many flowers, it symbolizes abundance.

== See also ==
- Islamic geometric patterns
