= Brazier =

Container used to burn charcoal or other solid fuel

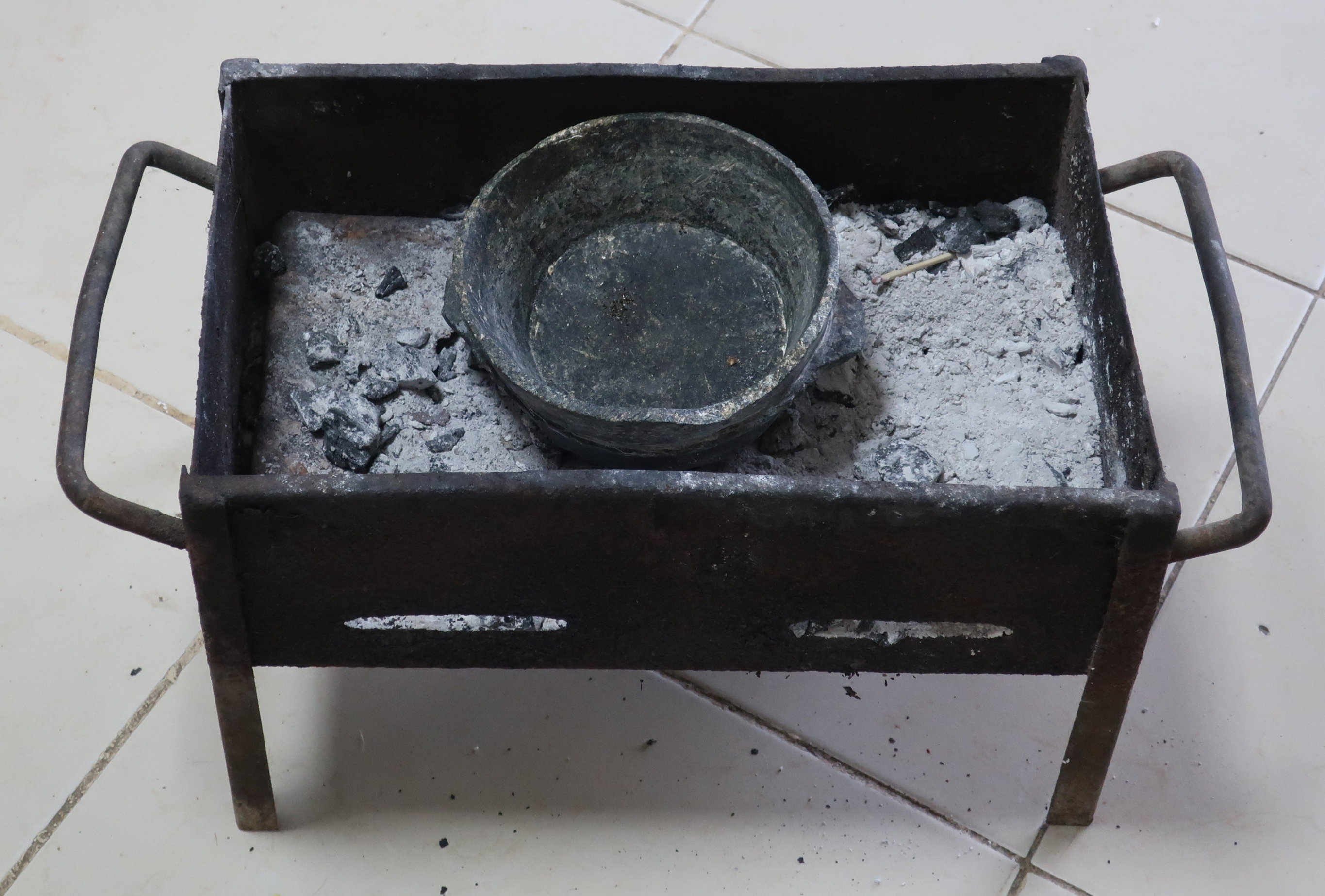
mangal

A brazier (/ˈbreɪʒər/) is a container used to burn charcoal or other solid fuel for cooking, heating, and/or rituals. It often takes the form of a metal box or bowl with feet, but in some places it is made of terracotta, a type of clay. Its elevation helps circulate air, feeding more oxygen to the fire. Braziers have been used since ancient times; the Nimrud brazier dates to at least 824 BC.

== History ==
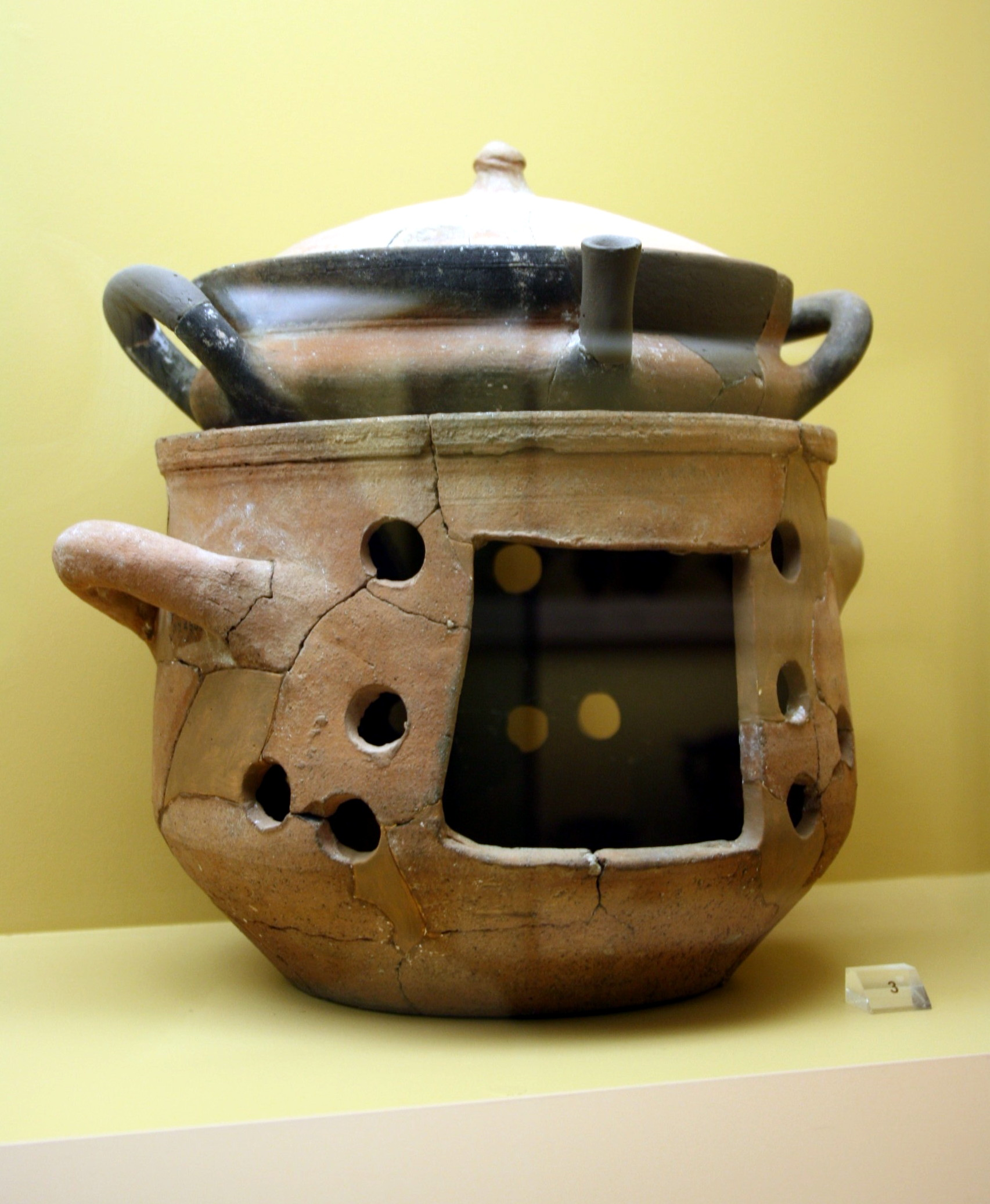
Ancient Greek brazier and casserole, 6th/4th century BC, exhibited in the Ancient Agora Museum in Athens, housed in the Stoa of Attalus

The word brazier is mentioned in the Bible. The Hebrew word for brazier is believed to be of Egyptian origin, suggesting that it was imported from Egypt. The lone reference to it in the Bible being the following verse:

The king was sitting in the winter-house in the ninth month; and the brazier (Hebrew: אָח) was burning before him.

Roman Emperor Jovian was poisoned by the fumes from a brazier in his tent in 364, ending the line of Constantine.

In Arabic, the brazier is called kanoun.

== Uses ==
=== Heating ===
Despite risks in burning charcoal on open fires, braziers were widely adopted for domestic heating, particularly and somewhat more safely used (namely in unglazed, shuttered-only buildings) in the Spanish-speaking world. Fernando de Alva Cortés Ixtlilxochitl noted that Tezozomoc, the Tlatoani of the Tepanec city of Azcapotzalco, slept between two braziers because he was so old that he produced no natural heat. Nineteenth-century British travellers such as diplomat and scientist Woodbine Parish and the writer Richard Ford, author of A Handbook for Travellers in Spain, state that braziers were widely considered healthier than fireplaces and chimneys.

The brazier could sit in the open in a large room; often it was incorporated into furniture. Many cultures developed their own variants of a low table, with a heat source underneath and blankets to capture the warmth: the kotatsu in Japan, the korsi in Iran, the sandali in Afghanistan, and the foot stove in northern Europe. In Spain the brasero continued to be one of the main means of heating until the early 20th century; Gerald Brenan described in his memoir South from Granada its widespread habit in the 1920s of placing dying embers of a brazier beneath a cloth-covered table to keep the legs and feet of the family warm on winter evenings.

=== Scent ===
Moist rose and grapevine trimmings produce a pungent, sweet-smelling smoke, and make charcoal, but unless fully pre-dried (seasoned or kilned) as with wood, do produce carcinogenic particulates in the air.

Aromatics (lavender seeds, orange peel) were sometimes added to the embers in the brazier.

A "brazier" for burning aromatics (incense) is known as a censer or thurible.

=== Other ===
In some churches a brazier is used to host a small fire, called new fire, which is then used to light the Paschal candle during the Easter Vigil.

Braziers were common on industrial picket lines, largely replaced by protest marches and rallies, while a newspaper casts strikes as being more white collar as a further reason for their decline.

The Japanese translation is hibachi - principally for cooking and in cultural rituals such as the Japanese tea ceremony.

Since 1957 Dairy Queen has used the word "brazier" on their signage to indicate a particular location serves hot food, such as hot dogs and hamburgers, in addition to ice cream treats.

== Gallery ==
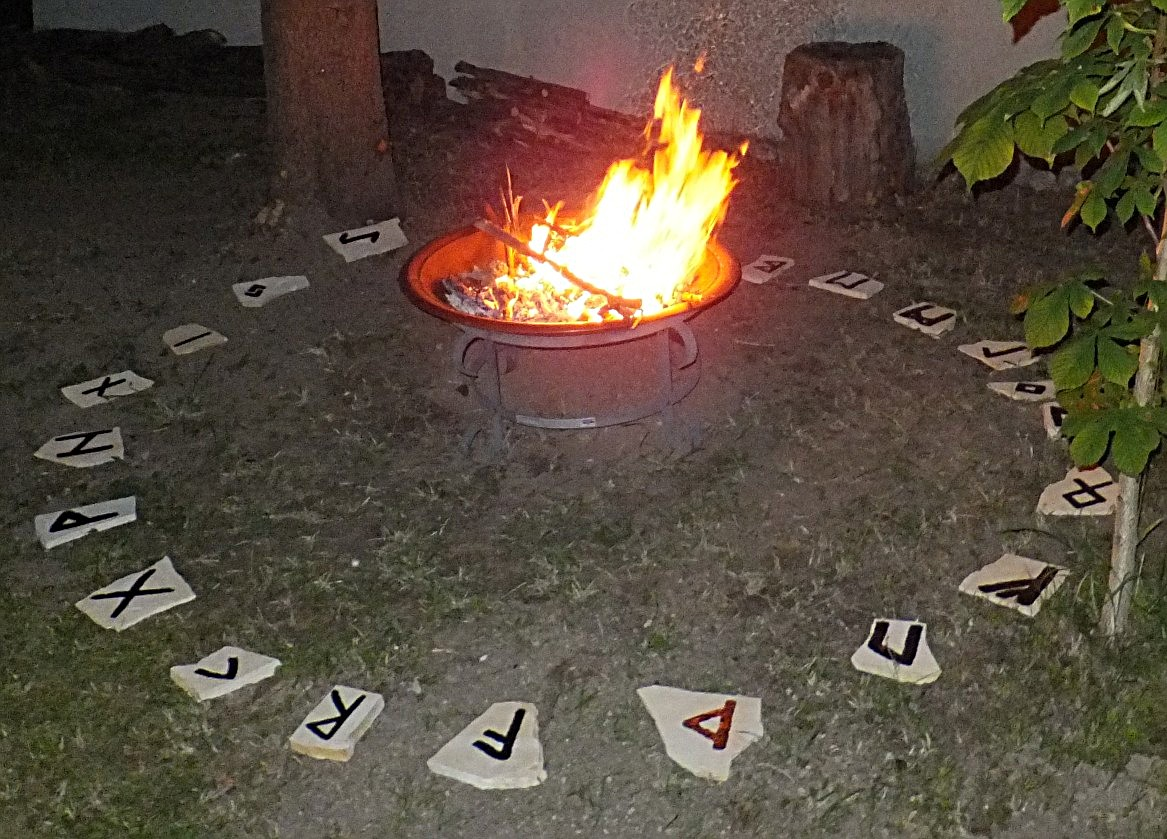
Brazier with burning fire in a rune stone circle at a summer solstice

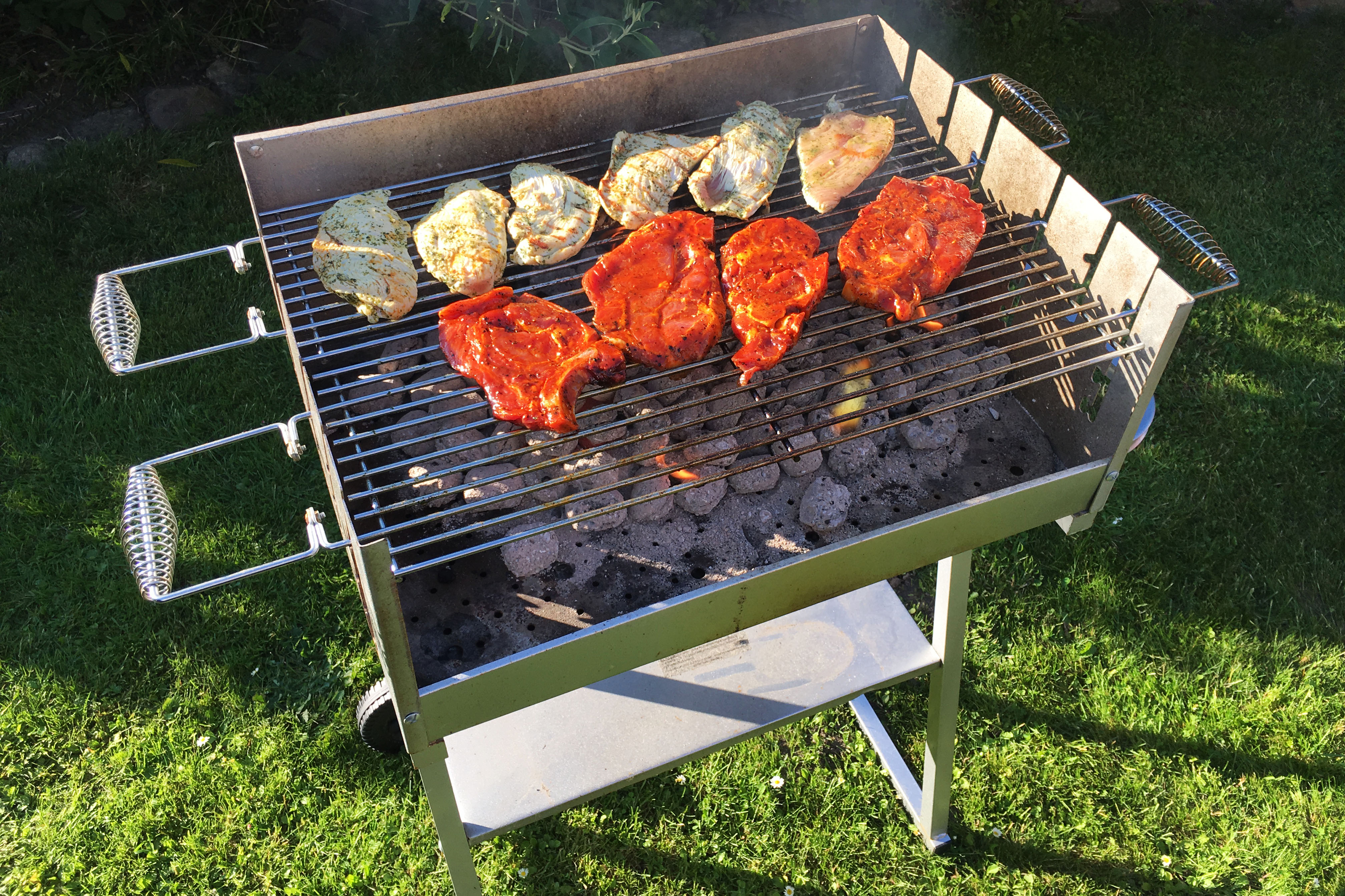
A brazier being used to grill chicken and steaks

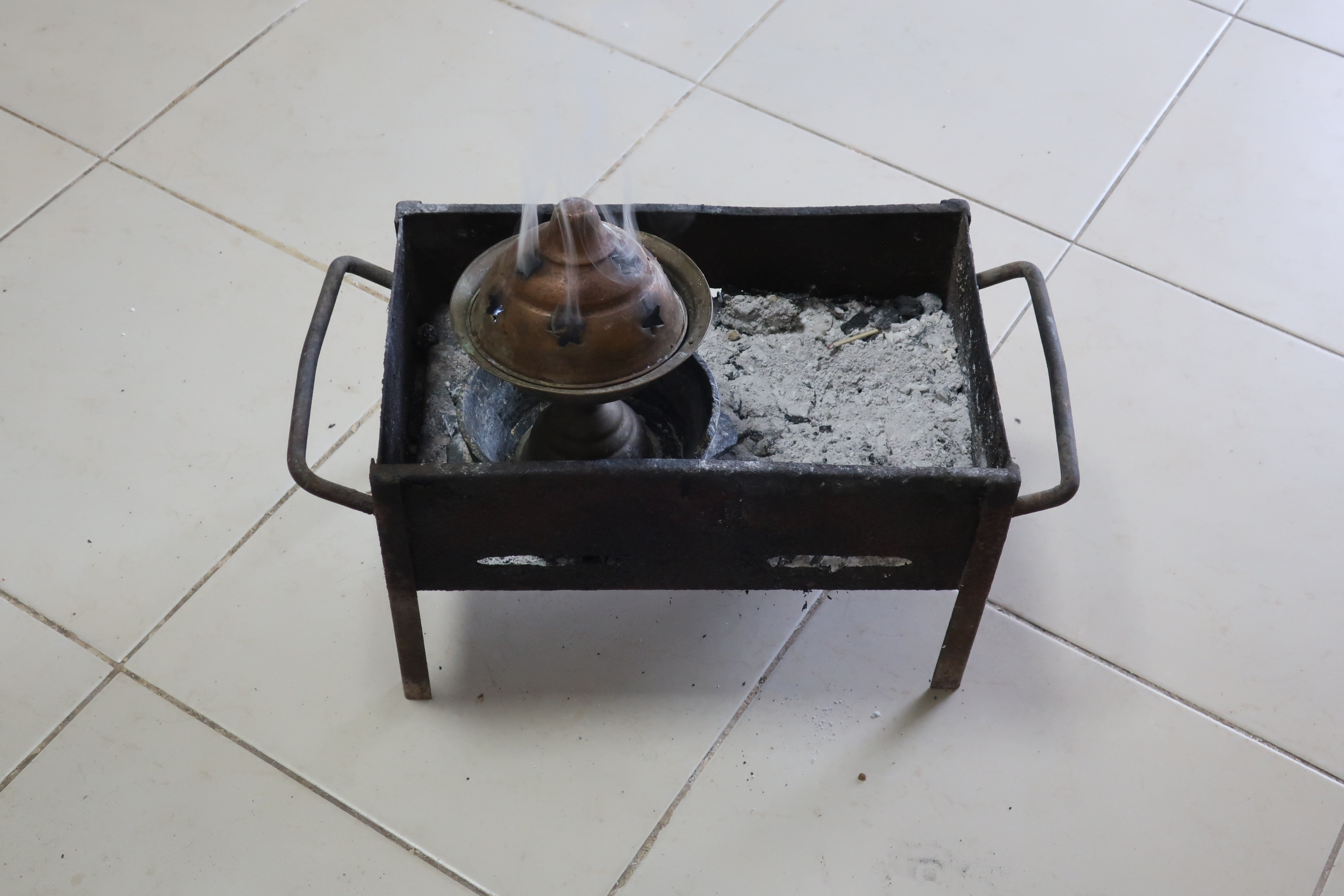
Smoking incense burner inside a brazier

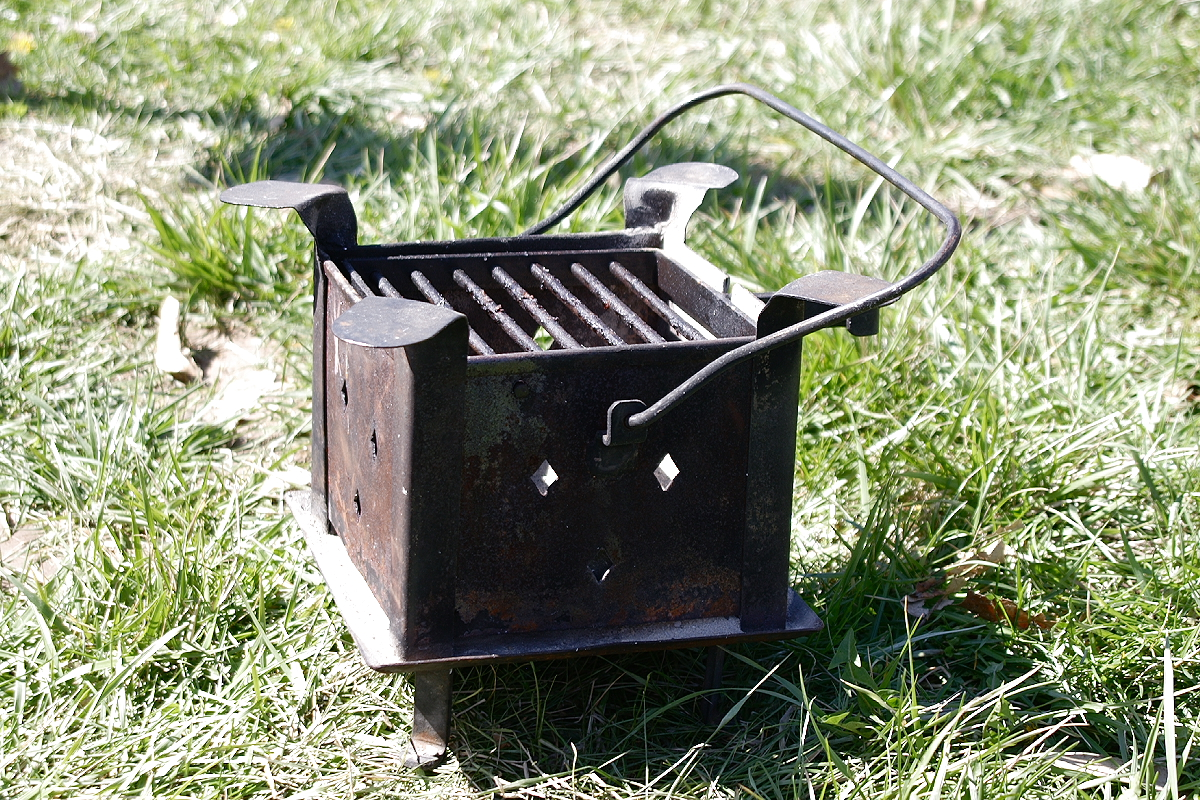
Simple box-style brazier, with broad grill, intended as a metal container (e.g. kettle/tray) heater/cooker

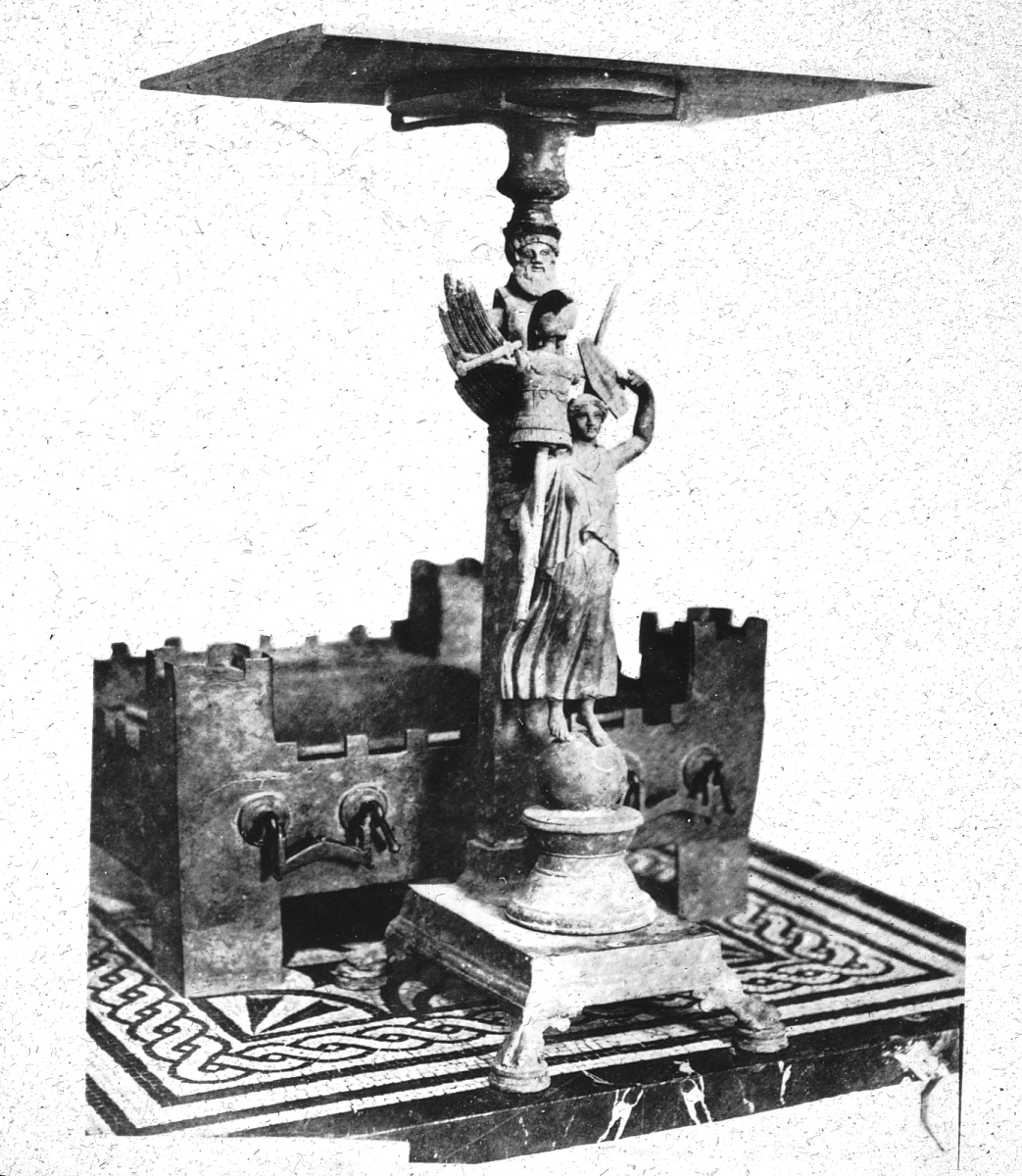
Pompeii, Italy. Table and small brazier to keep food warm. Brooklyn Museum Archives, Goodyear Archival Collection

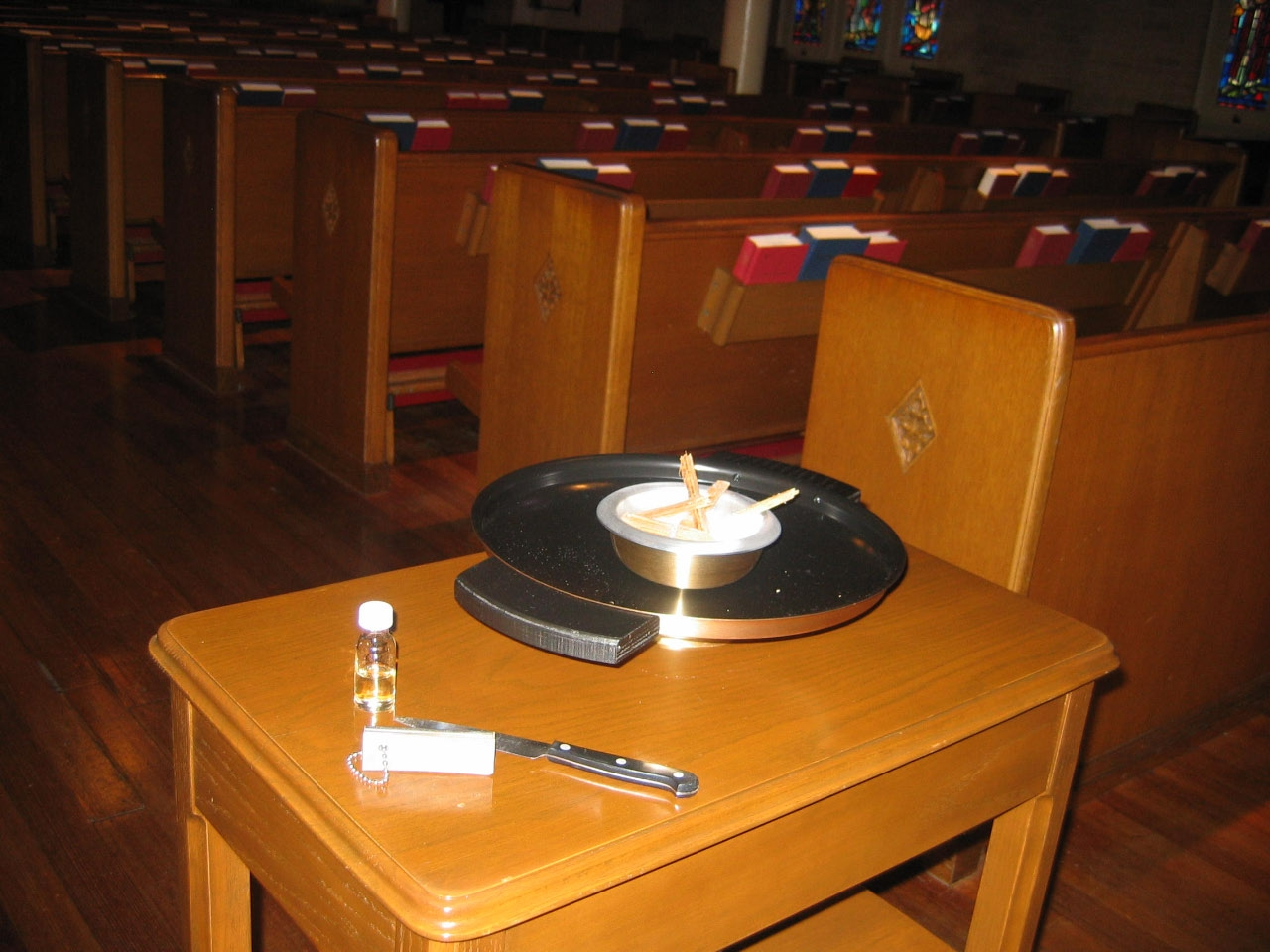
Brazier used for lighting the Paschal candle during Easter Vigil.

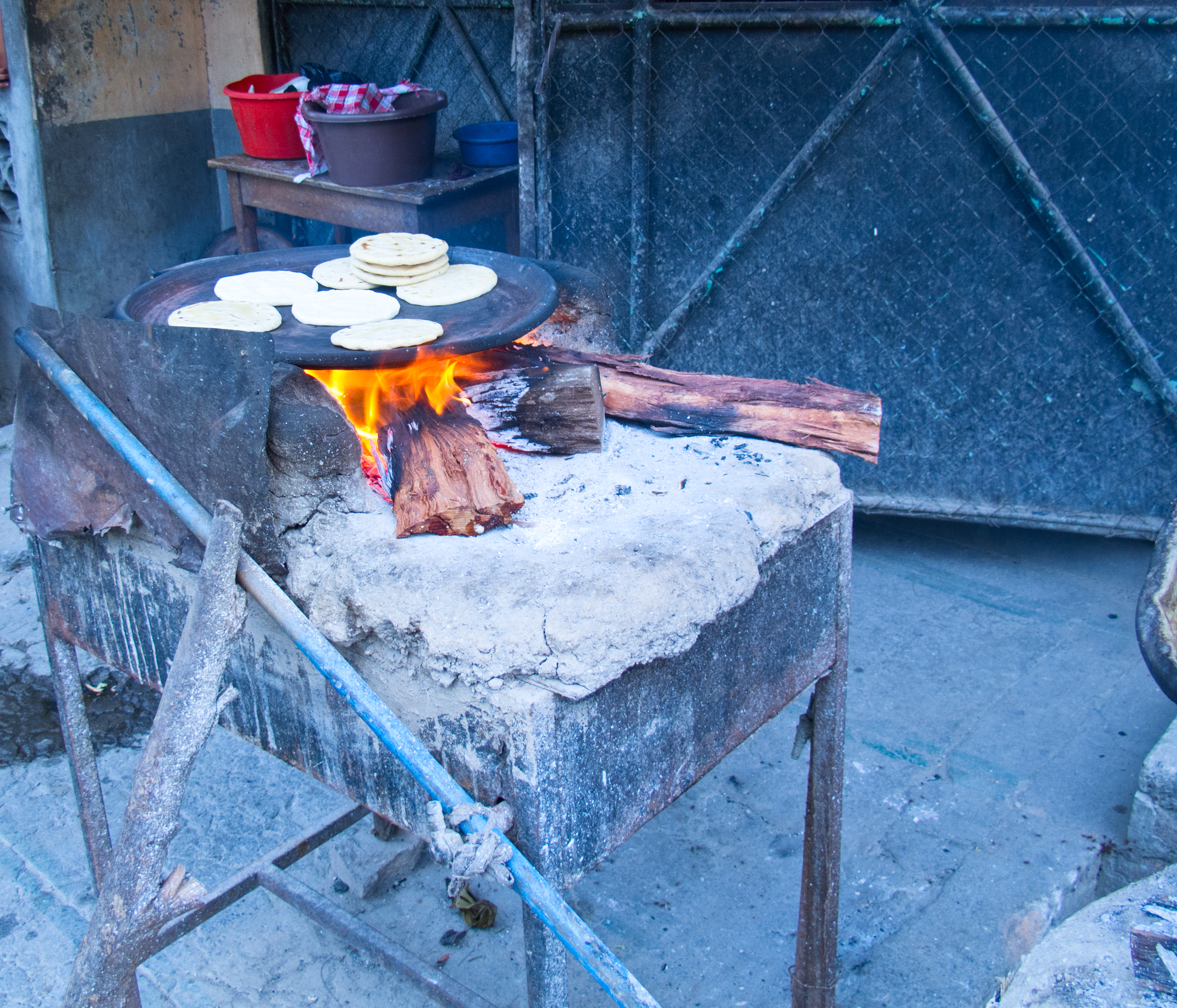
This is a small one used for cooking tortillas.

== See also ==
- Asado
- Angithi, a traditional Indian brazier
- Barbecue grill
- Chafing dish, a cooking implement
- Cresset, a cup for burning oil
- Crucible
- Fire basket
- Hibachi, a Japanese brazier
- List of cooking appliances
- Kanger, a traditional Kashmiri personal heating device
- Mangal (barbecue)
- Torch
