= Jajim =

Iranian textile type

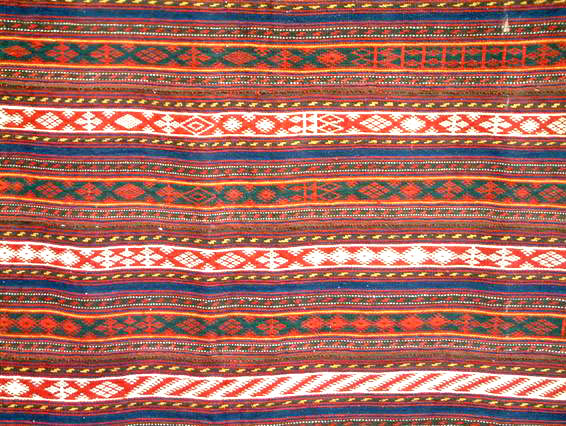
Jajim of the Kermanshah Province

Jajim (Persian: جاجیم; Azerbaijani: Cecim; Turkish: Cicim; Russian: Джаджим) also spelled as gelims, or jajim-bafi, is a handmade, flat-woven textile made of colored natural fiber which is created and used in the majority of villages and rural areas of Iran. Other locations the Jajim is found include Azerbaijan, Turkey, and India.

== About ==
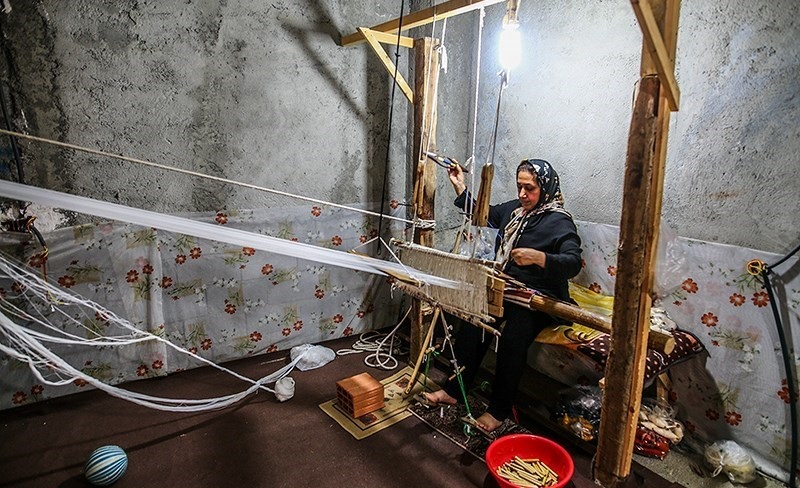
Woman weaving Jajim on a loom

The nomadic Shahsevan people are thought to be the originators of the handicraft. Jajim is a thicker textile, similar to a blanket. The yarn used to created Jajim are either wool, cotton, or a wool and cotton-blend. In contrast to the classically woven kilims and carpets which is a single panel, to weave a Jajim you create multiple narrow woven panels (often 4) and the panels are sewn together.

They traditionally were used as way for nomadic people to pack their belongings for migration. They have also been used as a mattress, to wrap a bed, as a korsi cover (a table heater), as a curtain, as a tent, and as a carpet. After a Qashqai bride and groom are married, they use Jajim to create a ceremonial tent.

Since 2020, the Iran Ministry of Cultural Heritage, Handicrafts and Tourism has been investing money in promoting the ancient craft through an educational program. Several museum collections have Jajims, include at the Fine Arts Museums of San Francisco (FAMSF).

== See also ==
- Iranian handicrafts
- Shahsevan rug
