= Brasero =

Brasero may refer to:

- Brasero (heater), a heater or an oven
- Brasero (software), CD/DVD-burning software for Linux

== See also ==
- Bracero program
