= Poshti (furniture) =

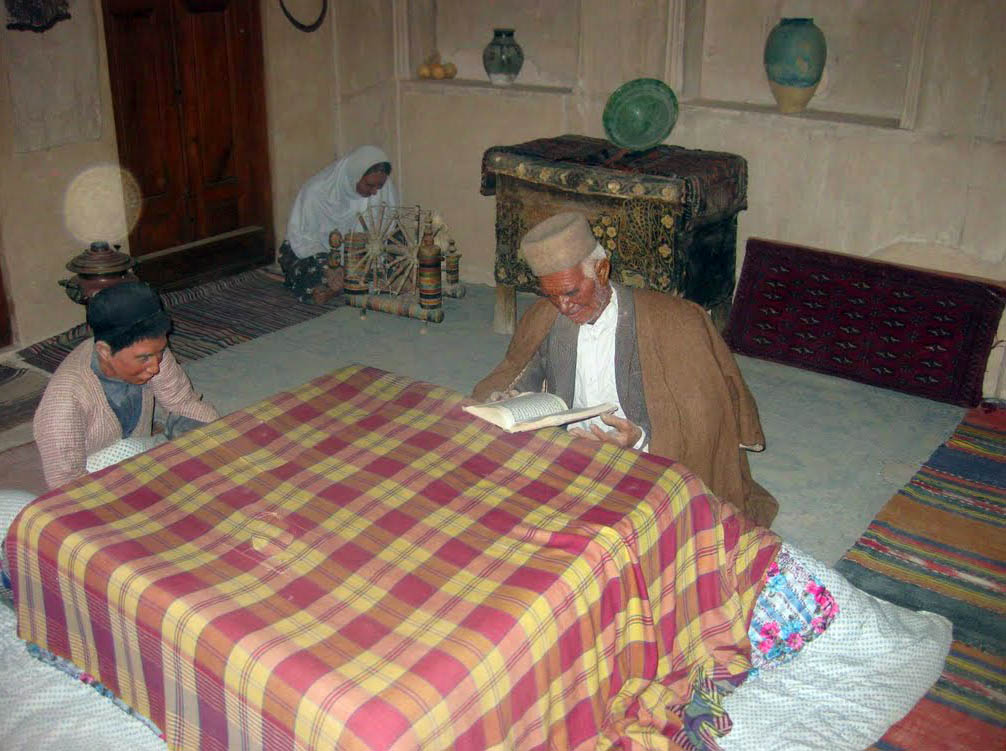
A korsi with a poshti against the wall in the background

Poshti (Persian: پشتی) is a backrest cushion upholstered with rug fragments. It is a traditional piece of furniture and part of the Iranian culture. Similar in appearance to a pillow but sturdier in material, poshti can have a square or rectangular shape. It is most commonly a one-piece item placed against the wall, but can come in two identical pieces as well, with one item placed on the floor as a mattress.

== Etymology ==
The term "poshti" derives from the Persian word "posht" (Persian: پشت), meaning "back," with the suffix "-i" indicating association, thus translating to "backrest."

== Cultural significance and usage ==
In traditional family gatherings such as Yalda, a set of poshtis were placed around a korsi and everyone would sit on the floor leaning against a poshti. Poshti is still sometimes used alongside modern furniture in Iran, however with changing lifestyles, it is becoming a decorative piece.

Apart from their functional use, poshtis hold cultural significance in Iranian homes and are often associated with hospitality and traditional seating arrangements. They are typically handcrafted using fragments of Persian carpets or kilim, featuring intricate designs and patterns that vary by region. These variations reflect Iran’s diverse textile traditions and historical craftsmanship.

== See also ==
- Divan (furniture)
- Ottoman (furniture)
