= Kotatsu =

Low, wooden table used in Japan, often with a heat source underneath

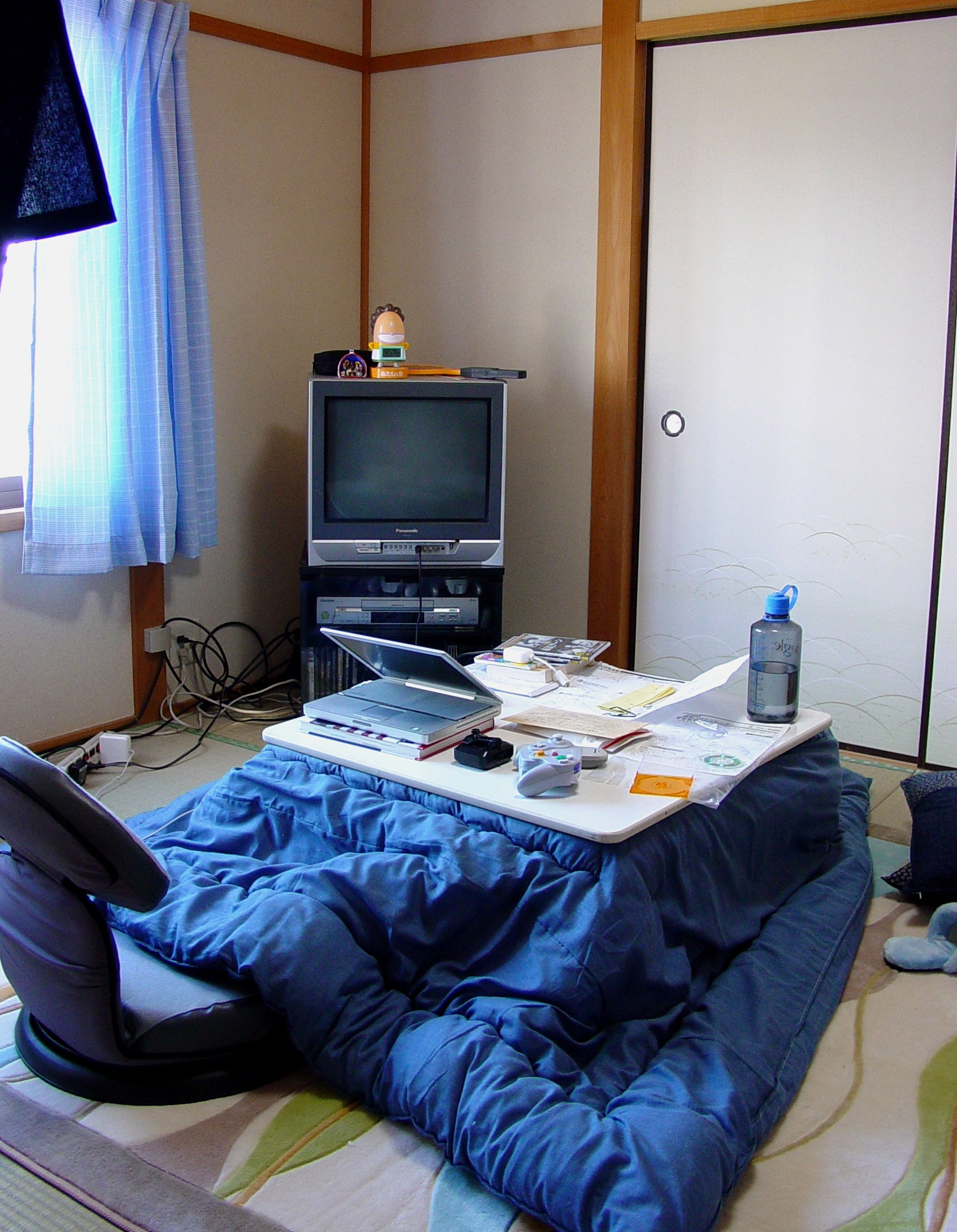
A modern Japanese kotatsu

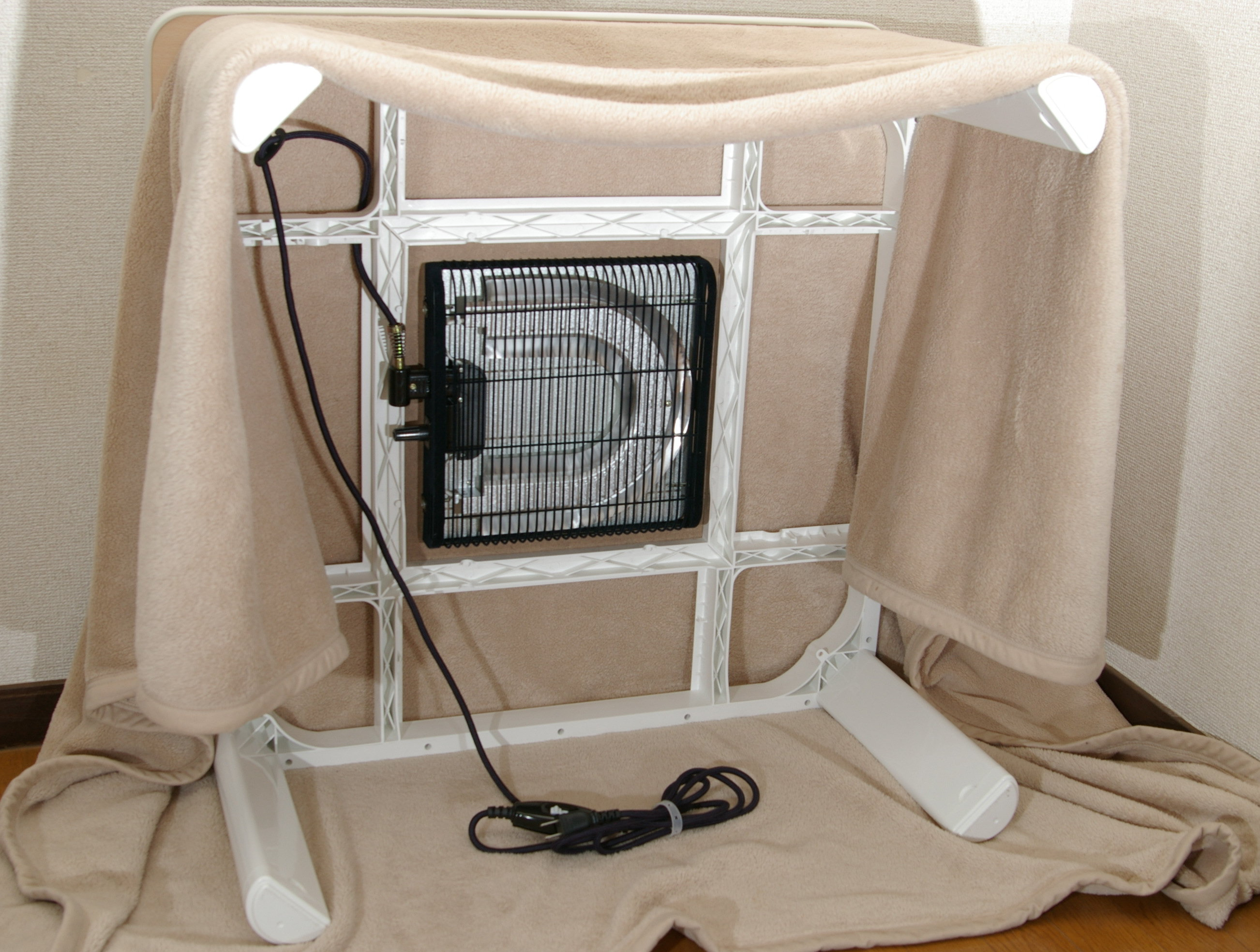
The underside of an electric kotatsu, with the heater visible in the centre

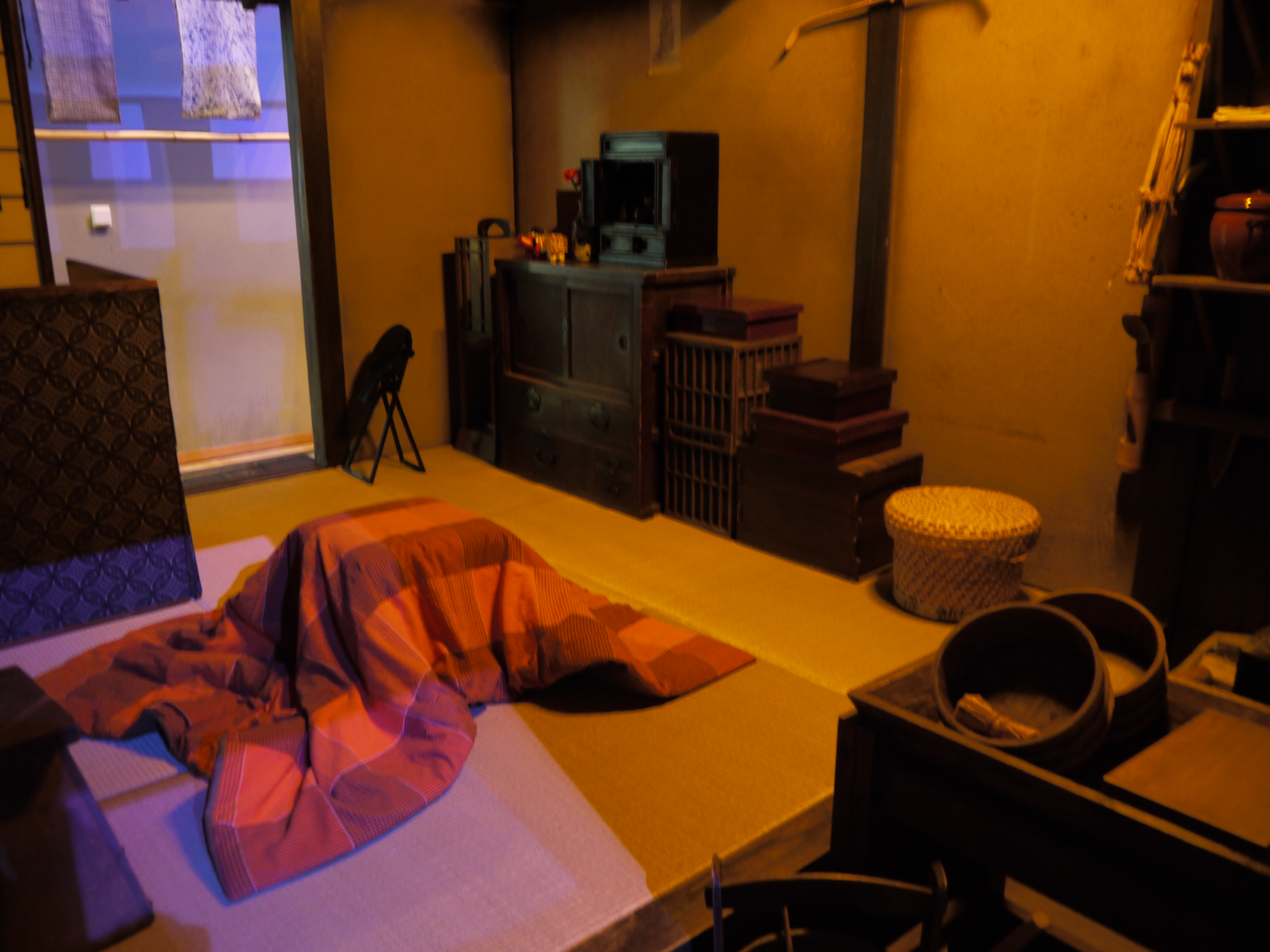
Edo-period kotatsu at the Fukagawa Edo Museum

A kotatsu (Japanese: 炬燵 or こたつ) is a low, wooden table frame covered by a futon, or heavy blanket, upon which a table top sits. Underneath is a heat source, formerly a charcoal brazier but now electric, often built into the table itself. Kotatsu are used almost exclusively in Japan, although similar devices for the same purpose of heating are used elsewhere, e.g. the Spanish brasero or Iranian korsi.

== History ==
The history of the kotatsu begins in the Muromachi period or Ashikaga shogunate during the fourteenth century. Its origins begin with the Japanese cooking hearth, known as the irori. Charcoal was the primary method of cooking and heating in the traditional Japanese household and was used to heat the irori. By the fourteenth century in Japan, a seating platform was introduced to the irori and its cooking function became separated from its seating function. On top of the wooden platform a quilt was placed, known as an oki that trapped and localized the heat of the charcoal burner. This early ancestor to the modern kotatsu was called a hori-gotatsu "dug kotatsu".

The formation of the hori-gotatsu was slightly changed in the Edo period during the seventeenth century. These changes consisted of the floor around the irori being dug-out into the ground in a square shape. The wooden platform was placed around this, making a hearth. Then the blanket was placed on top of the platform again, where one could sit with legs underneath to stay warm.

The moveable kotatsu was created later, originating from the concept of hori-gotatsu. This kotatsu came about with the popular use of tatami matting in Japanese homes. Instead of placing the charcoals in the irori, they were placed in an earthen pot which was placed on the tatami making the kotatsu transportable. This more modern style kotatsu is known as the oki-gotatsu "placed kotatsu".

In the middle of the twentieth-century charcoal was replaced with electricity as a heating source. Instead of having the moveable earthen pot of charcoals beneath the kotatsu, it was possible to attach an electric heating fixture directly to the frame of the kotatsu. By 1997, the majority (approximately two-thirds) of Japanese homes had the modern irori and 81 percent had a kotatsu, though they are warmed using electricity instead of glowing coals or charcoal. Thus, the kotatsu became completely mobile with electricity and became a common feature of Japanese homes during winter.

== Types ==
There are two kinds of kotatsu used in Japan today, differing in the configuration and the type of heating:

- Electric: The modern style of kotatsu, oki-gotatsu (置き炬燵), consists of a table with an electric heater attached to the underside of the table. This evolved from a clay pot with hot coals placed under a table. The kotatsu usually is set on a thin futon, like a throw rug. A second, thicker blanket is placed over the kotatsu table, above which the tabletop is placed. The electric heater attached to the underside of the table heats the space under the comforter.
- Charcoal: The more traditional type is a table placed over a recessed floor, hori-gotatsu (掘り炬燵). The pit is cut into the floor and is about 40 centimeters deep. A charcoal heater is placed somewhere in the pit's floor, walls, or, as in the modern-style kotatsu, attached to the table-frame. There are also pit-type kotatsu with an electric heater.
Types of heating and layers of the kotatsu

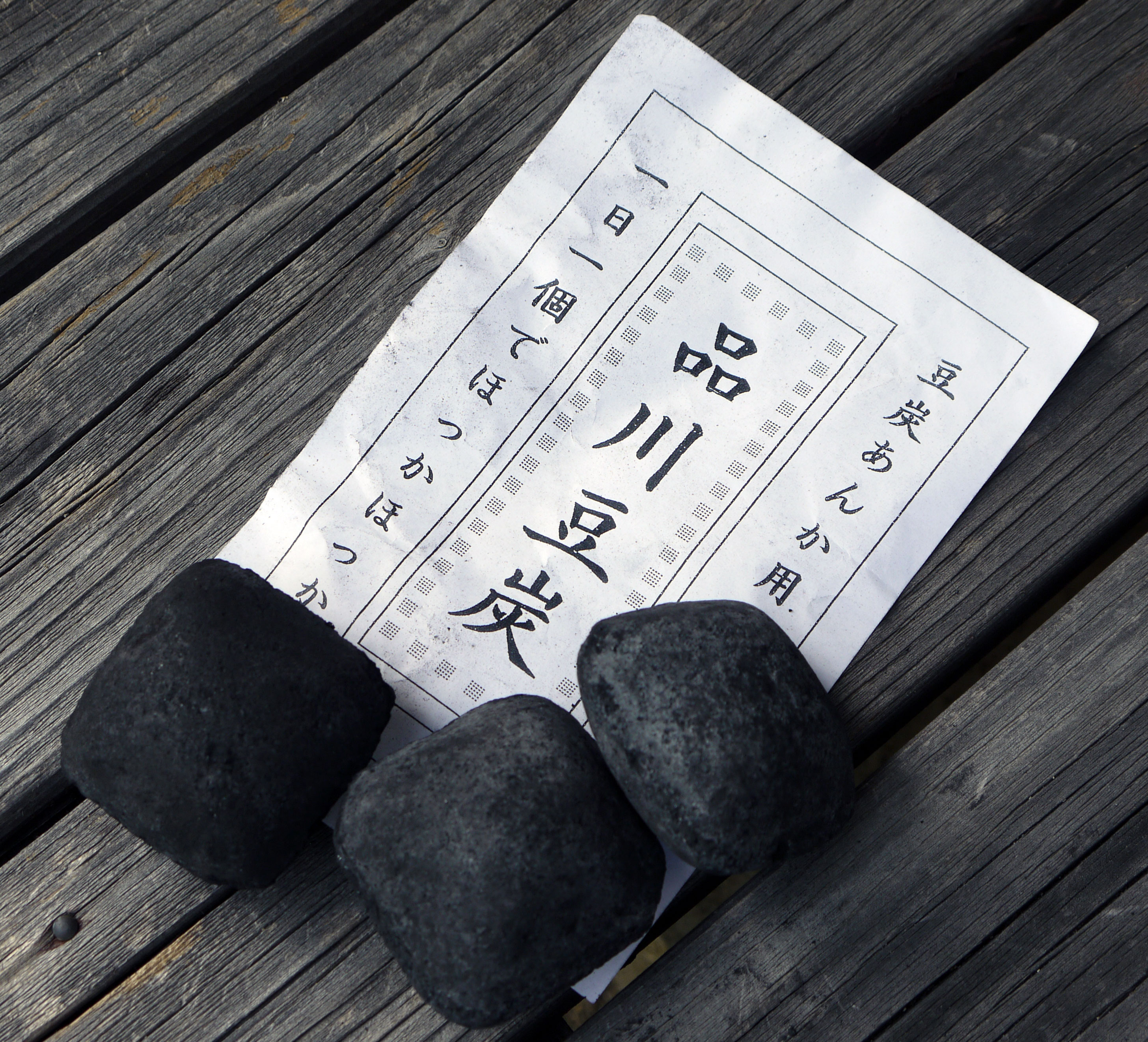
Mametan coal briquettes mostly used in the early twentieth century

== Use ==
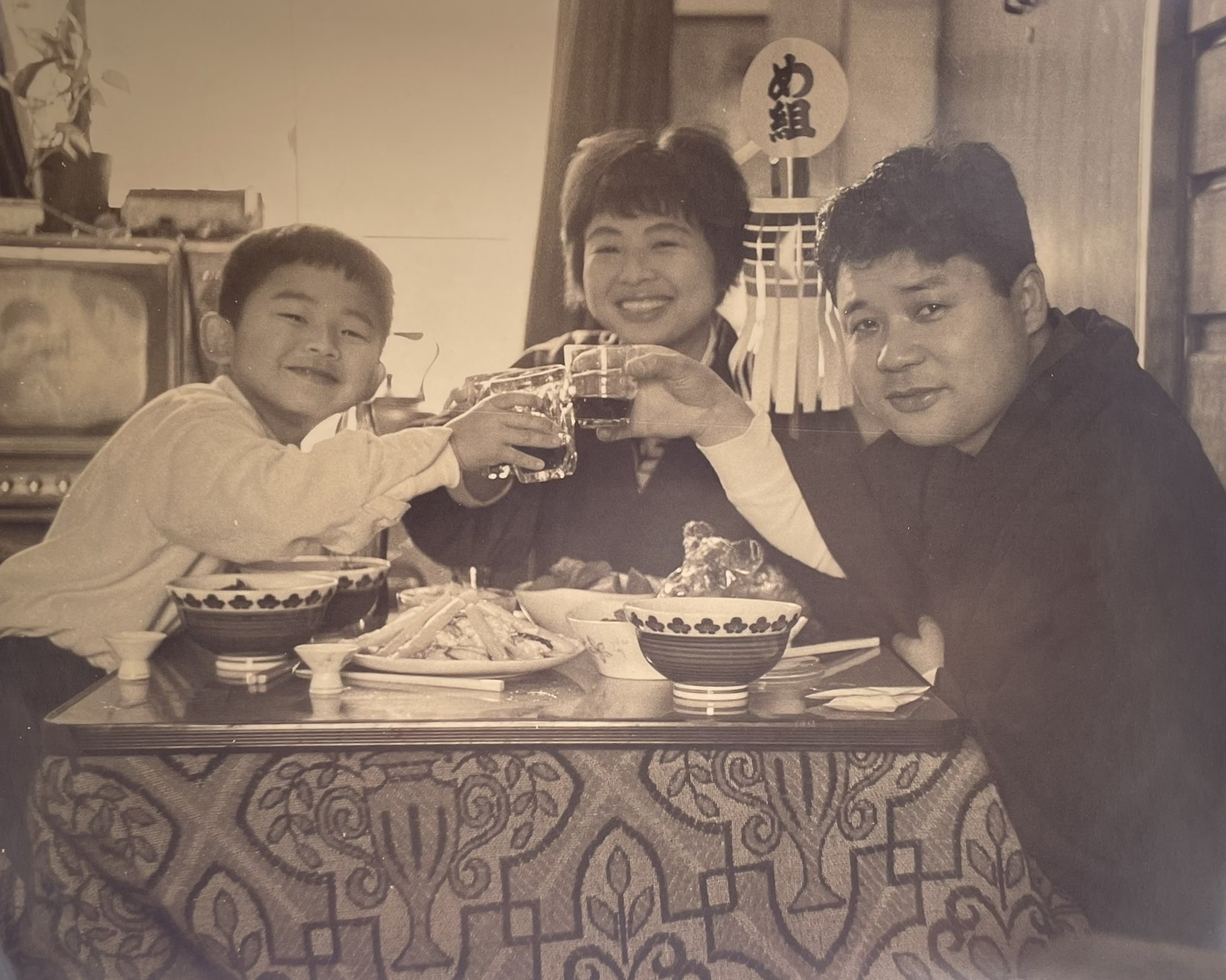
Household kotatsu in the Shōwa era, circa 1967

In the twenty-first century, the kotatsu typically consists of the electric heater attached to the frame, which is no longer limited to wood, but may be made of plastic or other materials. Generally, a blanket (or shitagake) is draped over the frame and heater and under the table-top. This first blanket is covered by a second heavier blanket, known as a kotatsu-gake (火燵掛布). A person sits on the floor or on zabuton cushions with their legs under the table and the blanket draped over the lower body. The kotatsu was designed when people most commonly wore traditional Japanese style clothes, where the heat would enter through the bottom of the robes and rise to exit around the neck, thus heating the entire body.

Most Japanese housing is not insulated to the same degree as a Western domicile and does not have central heating, thus relying primarily on space heating. Heating is expensive because of the lack of insulation and the draftiness of housing. A kotatsu is a relatively inexpensive way to stay warm in the winter, as the futons trap the warm air. Families may choose to concentrate their activity in this one area of the house in order to save on energy costs. In the summer, the blanket may be removed, and the kotatsu used as a normal table.

It is possible to sleep under a kotatsu, although unless one is quite short, one's body will not be completely covered. This generally is considered acceptable for naps, but not for overnight sleeping for many reasons: one's body is not completely covered, yielding uneven heating; the table is low, so one may touch heating elements accidentally when moving while asleep, risking burns. Traditionally, children are told that they will catch a cold if they sleep under a kotatsu. Pets, such as cats, frequently sleep under kotatsu, however, and are small enough to fit completely underneath—comparable to cats who sleep on floor heating vents in Western countries (Japanese homes do not generally have floor heating vents).

During the winter months in Japan, the kotatsu often is the center of domestic life. In the evening family members gather around the kotatsu to enjoy food, television, games, and conversation while keeping the lower half of their bodies warm. It has been said that "once under the kotatsu, all of your worries slip away as a familiar warmth takes over and you become completely relaxed."

Historically, kotatsu-gake were made of bast fibers. Later, cotton was introduced (1300s to 1700s, depending on region) and they were usually made of bast-filled quilts of recycled cotton, dyed with indigo and pieced from old garments in boroboro style. Kotatsushiki, for going under the kotatsu, as a floor covering, were made the same way. In the 2010s, kotatsu-gake were often decorative and might be designed to match home décor.

== Other countries ==
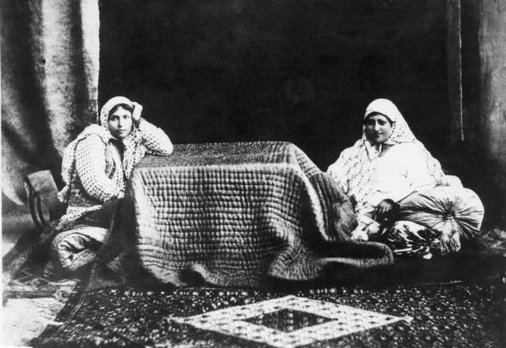
Persian korsí

There are similar economical and often sociable systems to keep warm while sitting still in countries around the world. In Spain and Portugal, the mesa camilla is a small round table with a brasero heater (i.e. a brazier) placed underneath. The Netherlands used to use a foot stove. During World War I, British Royal Engineers built 'Japanese footwarmers' in the trenches.

The 18th-century traveler Lady Mary Wortley Montagu describes the similar tendour in her Turkish Embassy Letters.

Tajikistan and Afghanistan have the very similar sandali, used even today in many traditional houses as a warm family eating place. Another similar item called the korsi is used likewise in Iran.

In China and Korea, underfloor heating traditionally is used. The devices used in a similar fashion are, respectively, a Kang bed-stove and an ondol. Romans used a hypocaust for underfloor heating.

== See also ==
- Chabudai, a short-legged table used in traditional Japanese homes
- Electric blanket
- Hibachi, a traditional Japanese heating device
- Korsi
- Passive house
