= Brasero (heater) =

Heater commonly used in Spain

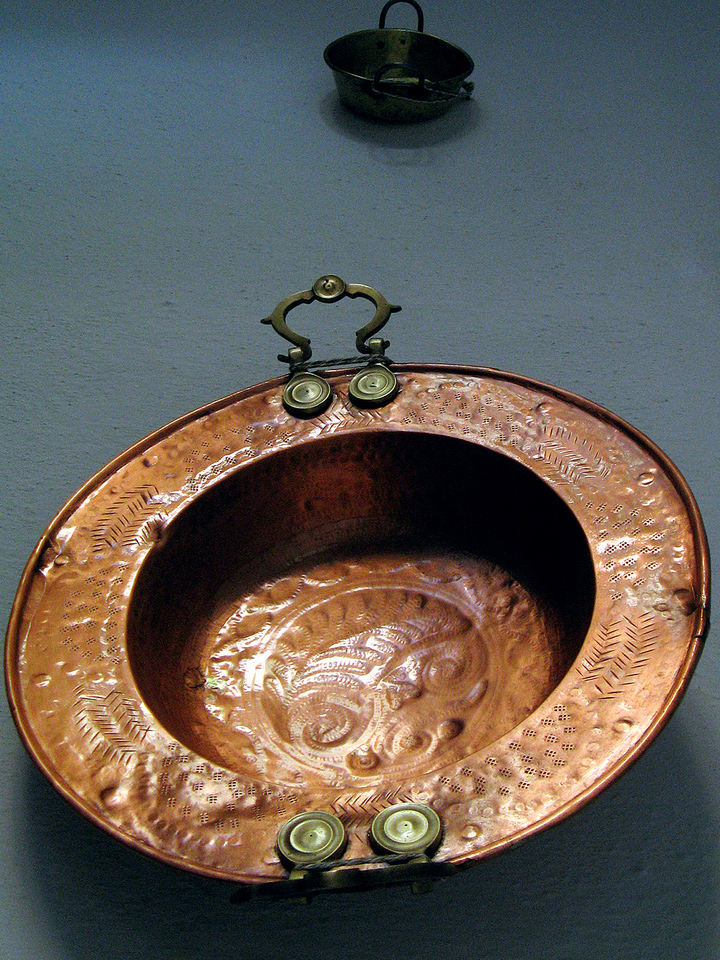
Copper brasero

A brasero (Spanish: "brazier") is a heater commonly used in Spain. It is placed under a table covered with a cloth that extends to the floor to provide heat for people sitting at the table. This arrangement (which is called a mesa camilla) is similar to the Japanese kotatsu or Iranian korsi. Braseros were traditionally heated with small pieces of charcoal, called cisco or picón; nowadays they are usually electric. Modernly, certain deposits of burning embers, such as the upper compartment of solid fuel heating boilers, are called braseros.

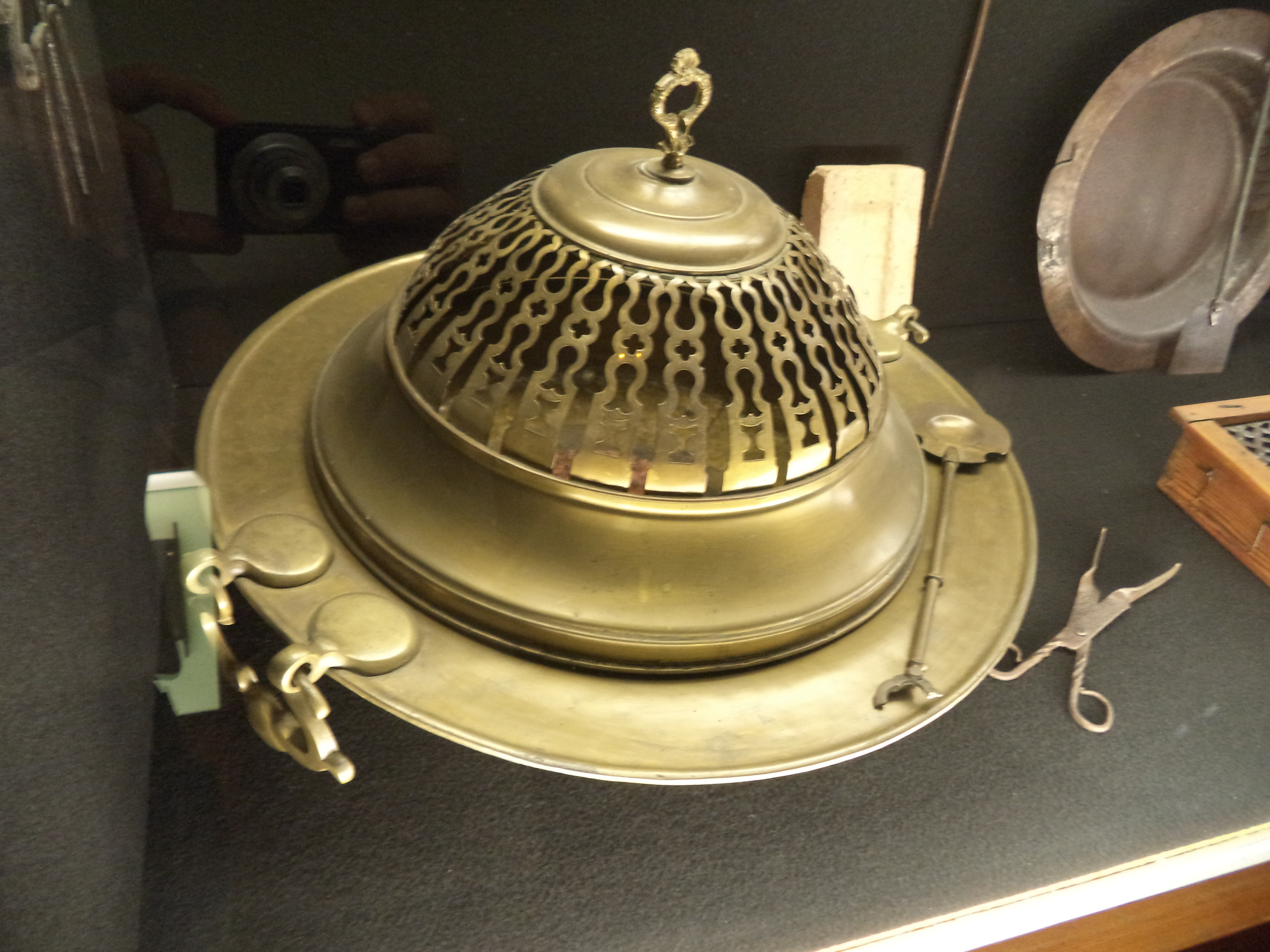
Brass brasero

By extension, the term was used to define the place where certain criminals condemned to the stake were executed, generally Jews or infidels victims of one of the most common methods with which the "secular arm" executed those condemned by the Inquisition.

== History ==
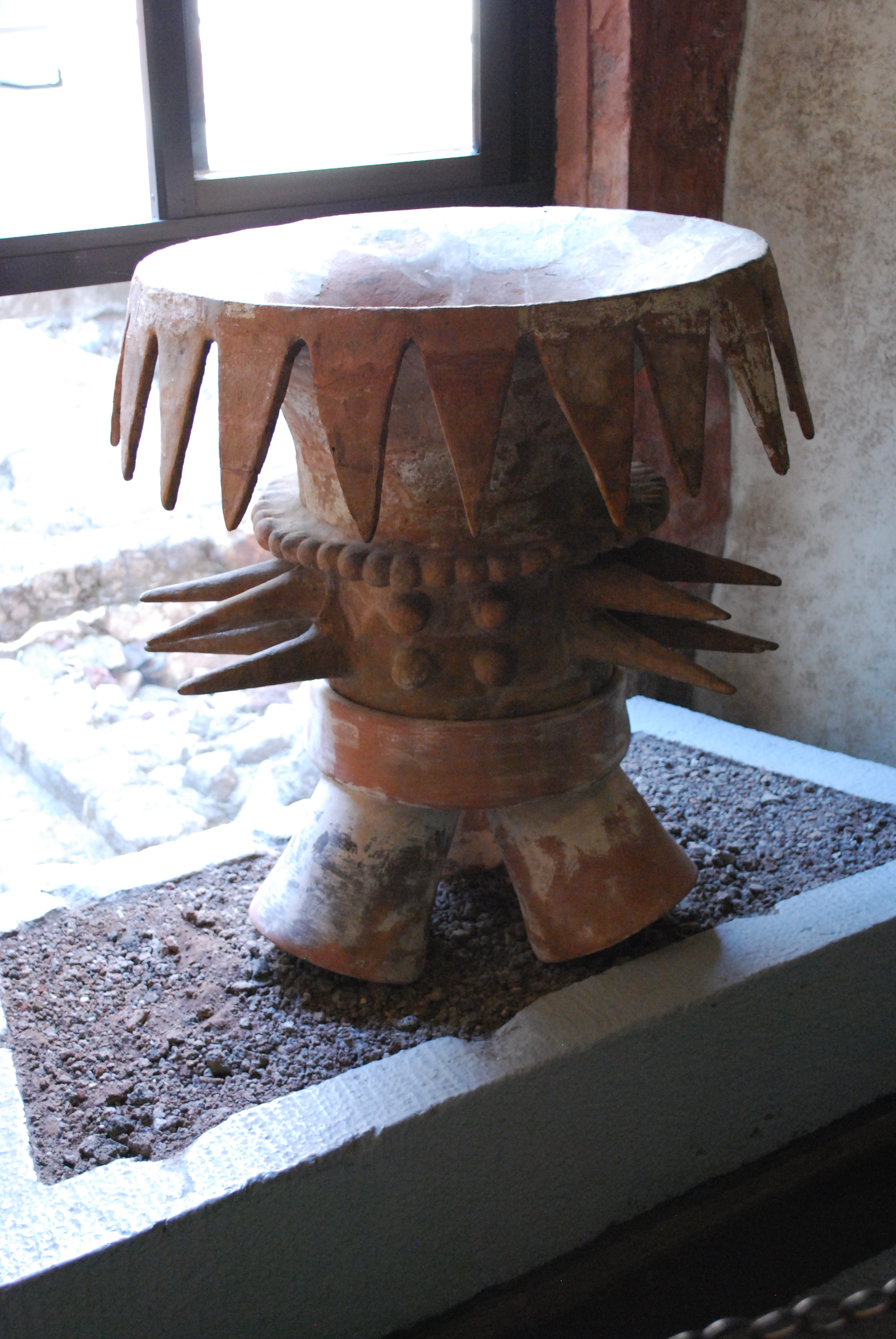
Tlecaxilt, brasero of the Tlahuica culture

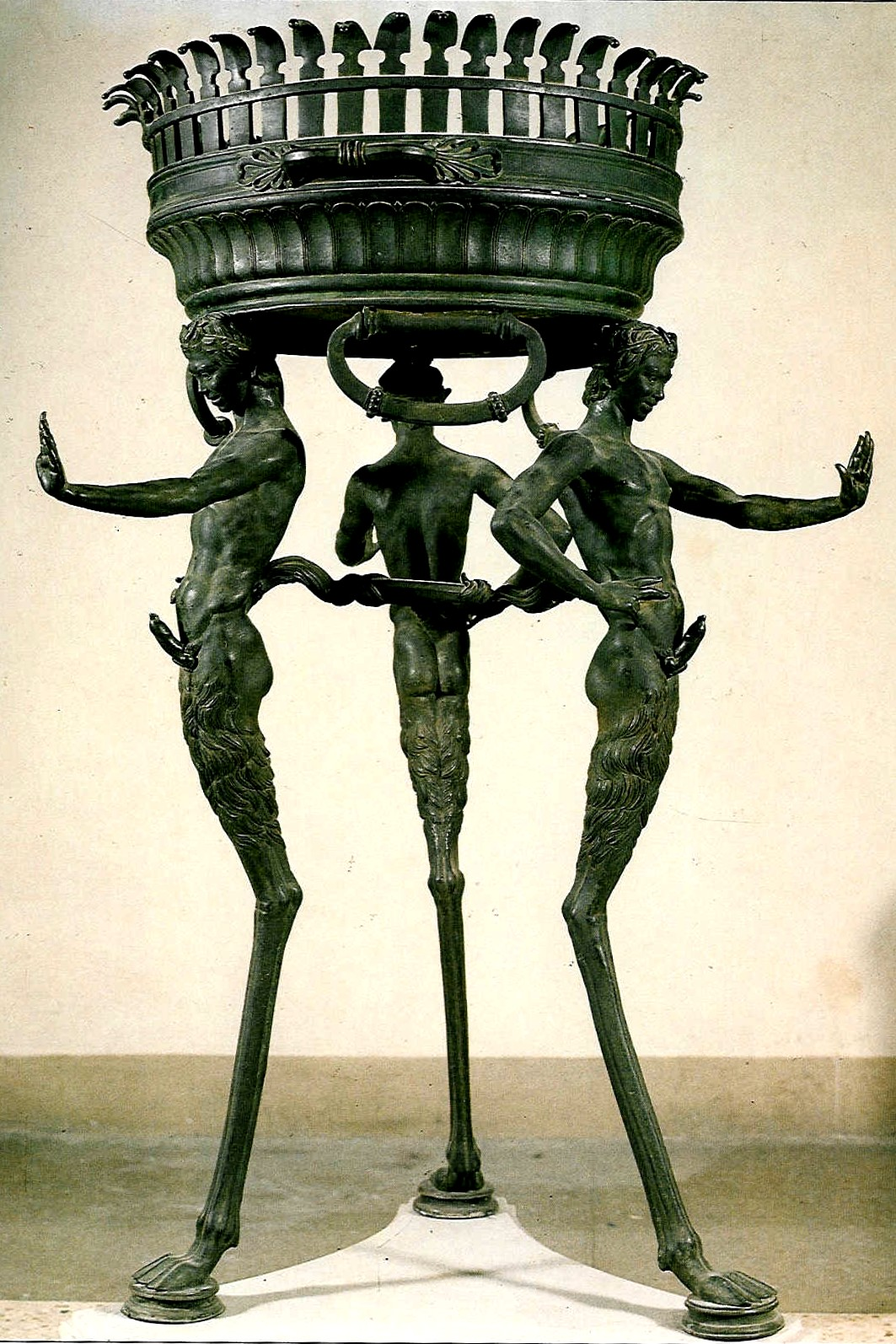
Brasero of Pompeii

In several archaeological museums, braseros from Etruria and Rome are displayed. Generally made of bronze, they have quadrangular, circular and oblong shapes; they rest on feet in the shape of wheels or animal claws, or on tripods, and some have rich ornaments in relief. Their use as peveters, in principle, was more religious than thermodomestic. This is also what the examples found in the Iberian Peninsula, of Iberian braseros seem to indicate.

Perhaps the oldest precedent of the brasero is an ancestor of the Iranian korsi, used among other occasions on the occasion of the Persian festival of Yalda. In pre-Columbian America, there are numerous similar artifacts, from the Aztec tlecaxitl of religious uses, to the braseros-fireplaces studied by instructor Raúl Ybarra. In Japan there is a similar device, the kotatsu. In South America, especially in the Río de la Plata, a brasero model with barbecue functions is still preserved.

== Historic items ==
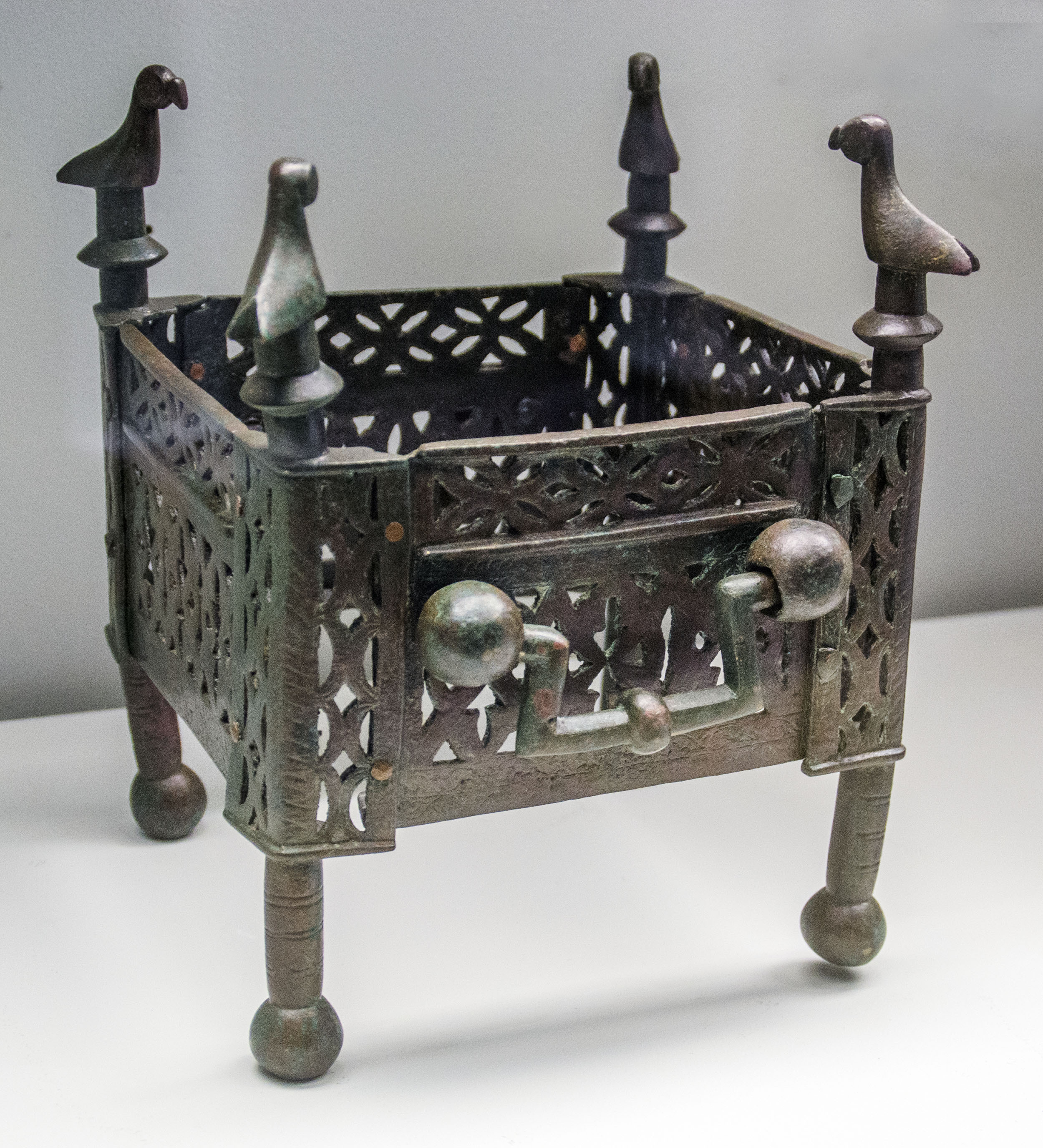
Almohad period bronze-brass brasero

In the Episcopal Museum of Vic there is a brasero dating back to the 14th century which nevertheless corresponds to a typology of Romanesque roots or even earlier.

The Barcelona History Museum preserves a pair of large braseros, key pieces of Catalan Baroque metalwork, which were made by the coppersmith Pere Cerdanya in 1675 and which were used to heat the Saló de Cent de la House of the City of Barcelona .

In two of the most important paintings by the Catalan painter Marià Fortuny, . The stamp collector and La vicaria, highlights the prominence of single braseros.

== Materials ==
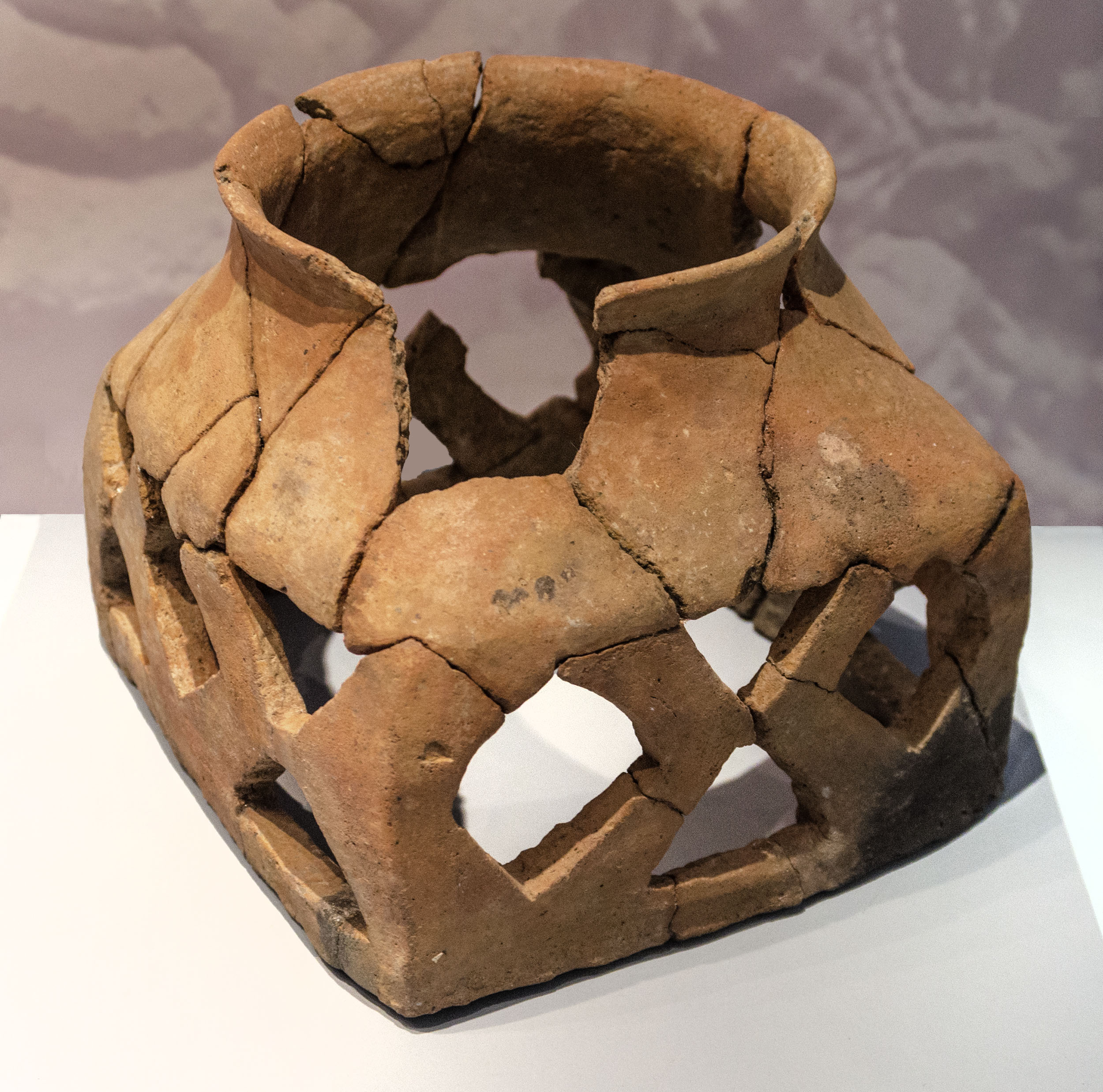
Ceramic brasero

Although the most widespread and traditional brasero was the metal brasero made of different alloys throughout history, there were also several models of ceramic brasero (due to its condition as a pottery object with older precedents ). They used to be open containers, ovoid in shape and with multiple holes. It has often been confused with the portable stove, used to keep the pot of food warm, although this, and especially its embers, could be used as a brasero or to feed it.

Another important chapter is occupied by braseros made of fine chopped stone, many of them in noble stones, common among the remains of the Arab civilization in al-Andalus.

== Use and operation ==
The domestic metal brasero is a concave container usually provided with a lid with cracks through which the heat escapes or, the more modest ones, with a metal wire to avoid burning. To avoid contact with the floor, expensive models included a foot or stand. The fuel par excellence was a type of very small and long-burning charcoal .

The brasero is placed in the center of the rooms or under special tables, called camillas, on a wooden platform perforated in the center to fit it, which also serves as a footrest. To revive the fire a metal instrument is used consisting of a handle and a round paddle, doubly perforated on the upper edge; when the combustion languishes and the heat goes down, it is stirred with the paddle very carefully. For people who spent a lot of time sitting on the camilla, some kind of very uncomfortable spots or blisters appeared on their legs.

Considered a dangerous contraption inside the home due to the fact that it generates embers without being perfectly protected and produces CO, it was the cause of frequent fires, mainly when it came into contact with the skirts of the bunk table and various pieces of clothing of the people However, the most serious danger was the possibility of poisoning due to the emission of carbon monoxide, which occurred especially in poorly ventilated rooms, due to incomplete combustion due to lack of oxygen.

== Electric brasero ==
In the second half of the 20th century the traditional brasero fell into disuse. Using the traditional cisco/charcoal/pitch brasero required a place to store the coal, a place to dispose of the ashes, and was a very dirty task for a small city dwelling, and with economic development there were who preferred the use of the electric brasero for the convenience of having a plug and even a switch on the cable, which allowed for immediate heat and without coal embers that could generate a fire from a spark or CO poisoning produced by a bad combustion of these.

Currently, there are still people, especially very old people and in villages, who continue to use this type of braseros, and, unfortunately, every year there are many deaths, from fires or from inhaling carbon dioxide due to poor combustion of the coal or the fire itself by a resistance that becomes red hot in the case of electric braseros and that burns when something comes into contact with it.

It is easy to fall asleep in the heat of the brasero and that the footwear, or some garment, or the so-called "bunkcloth" (there are different names for this, usually thick, coat cloth, with which the bedside table where the braseros are placed), end up unknowingly coming into contact with the brasero, even committing the imprudence of leaving it on (or by forgetting) while falling asleep or out of house, and that the high energy consumption of the brasero generates overheating in the cables, the plug or the table and this "clothing" with which the bunk table is covered to prevent the heat (hot air) from escaping under the table

In some houses, to avoid possible contact with the feet, they put a protection, like a cage, on the brasero, although this did not prevent sparks or poor combustion.

Then another device emerged, which, like electric braseros, has a resistance that heats up with the passage of the electric current, and which is usually known as a "lloret" since they have the shape of a small cage, and are hung under of the top of the bunk table (with average consumption of 450 W).

And finally, to avoid all the risks of the electric brasero (which in cases of forgetting to turn it off end up being a source of fire), and to reduce the energy costs of the electric brasero, which is very high, every day more and more people who choose ecological heaters with very low consumption, which, without losing heat quality, consume less than 100 w. This avoids circulation problems in the legs, fires, high consumption and other damages caused by braseros and which have already been resolved.

== In the culture ==
Two painters, the Catalan Fortuny in the 19th century, and Julio Romero de Torres in the first third of the 20th century, painted beautiful examples of braseros and supports, the fruit of the imagination of boilermakers.

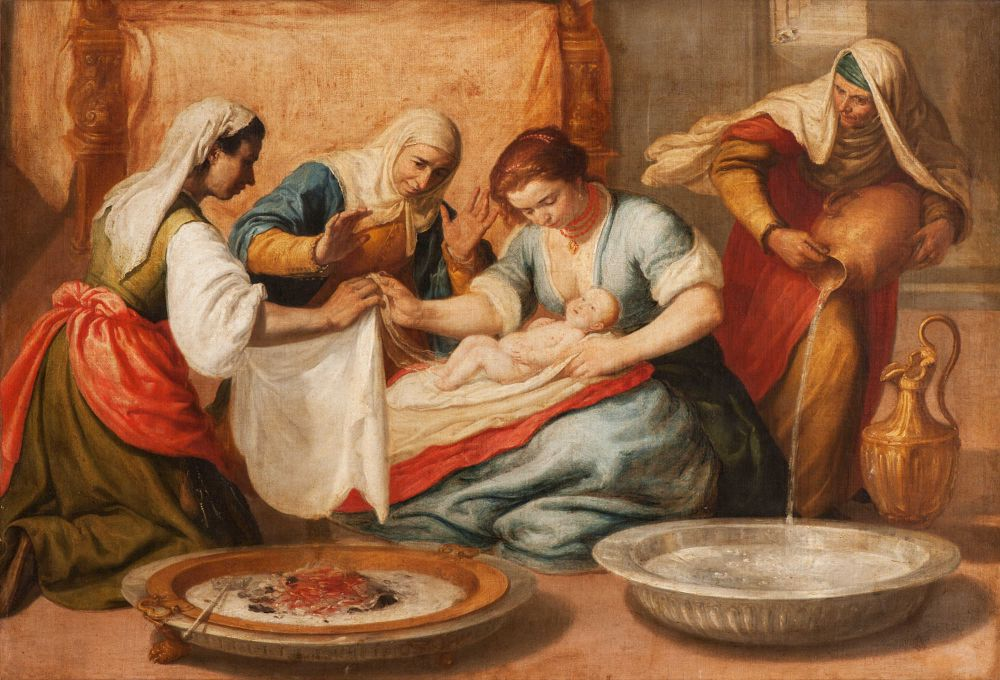
Brasero bed, in The Birth of the Virgin, anonymous oil of the 17th century

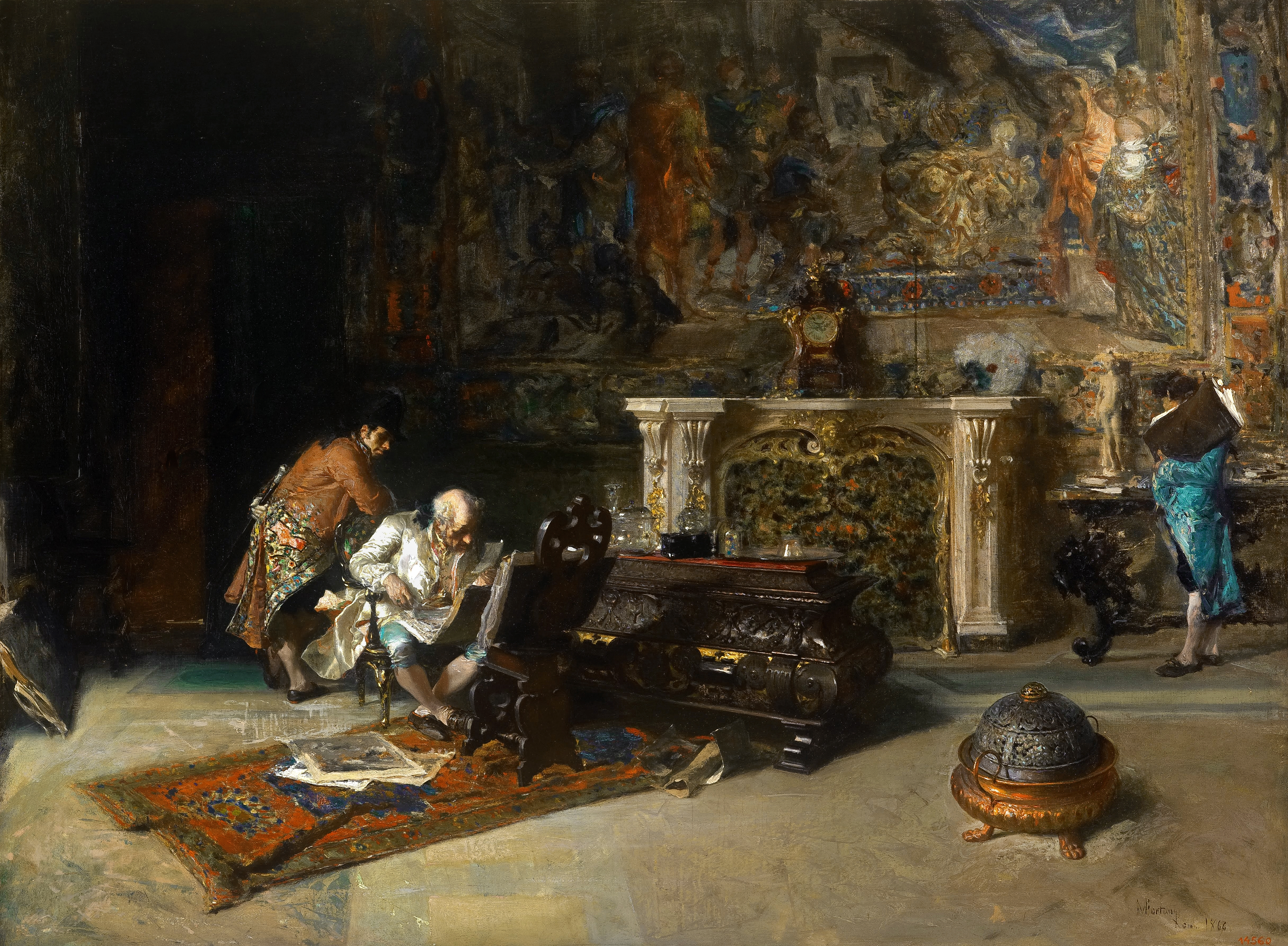
Brasero with metal support in The print collector (engravings), painted by Mariano Fortuny (c. 1870)

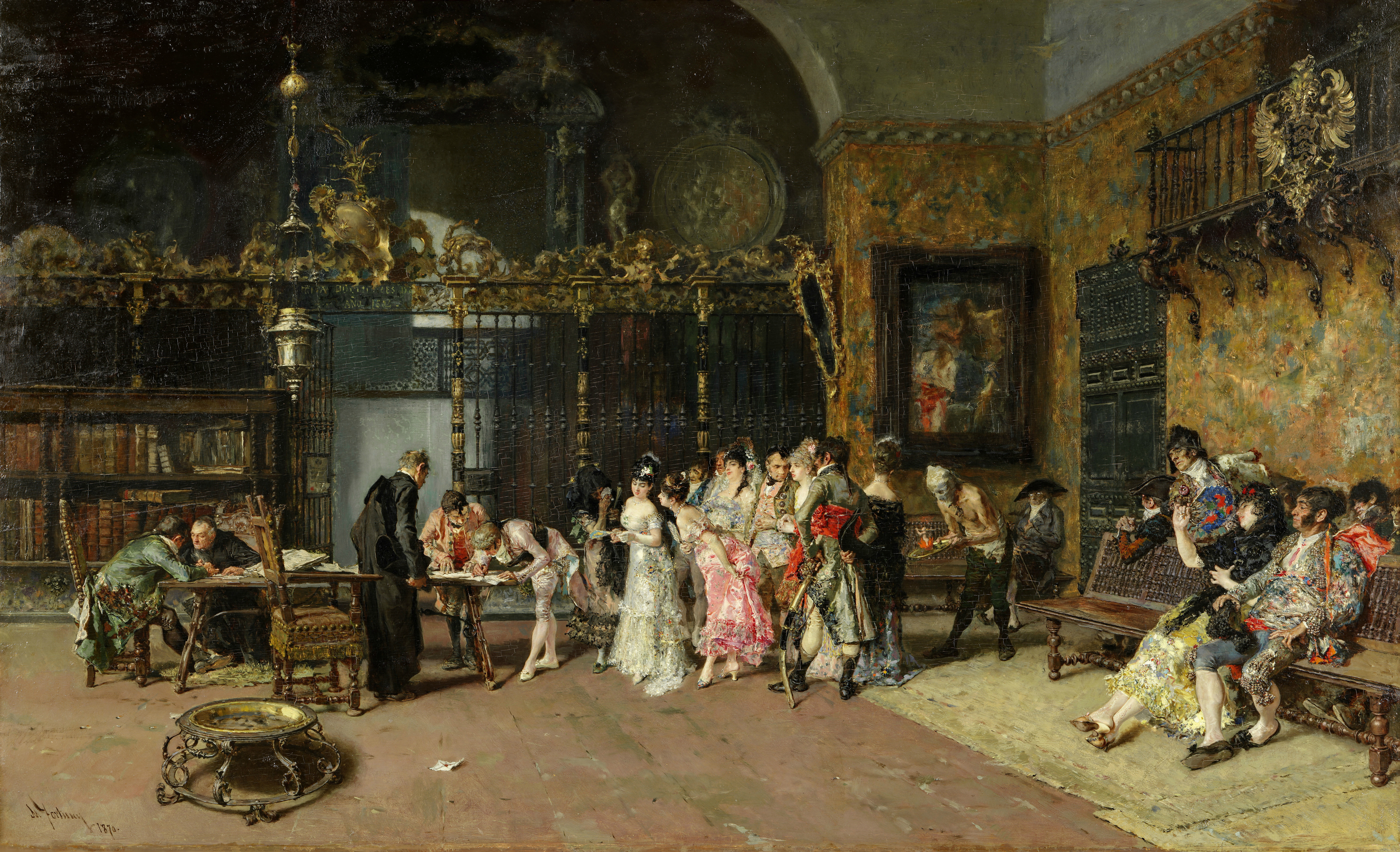
Below, on the left, the large brasero of the Vicar, work by Mariano Fortuny (c.1870). MNAC

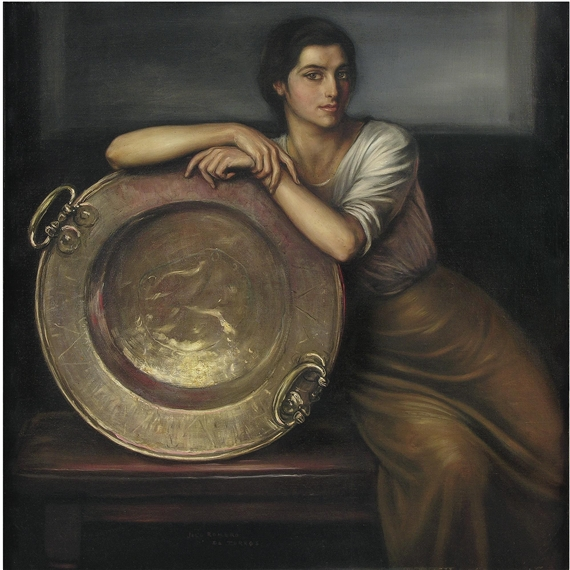
Large brasero with the Amparo model, oil on canvas painted by Julio Romero de Torres in 1920

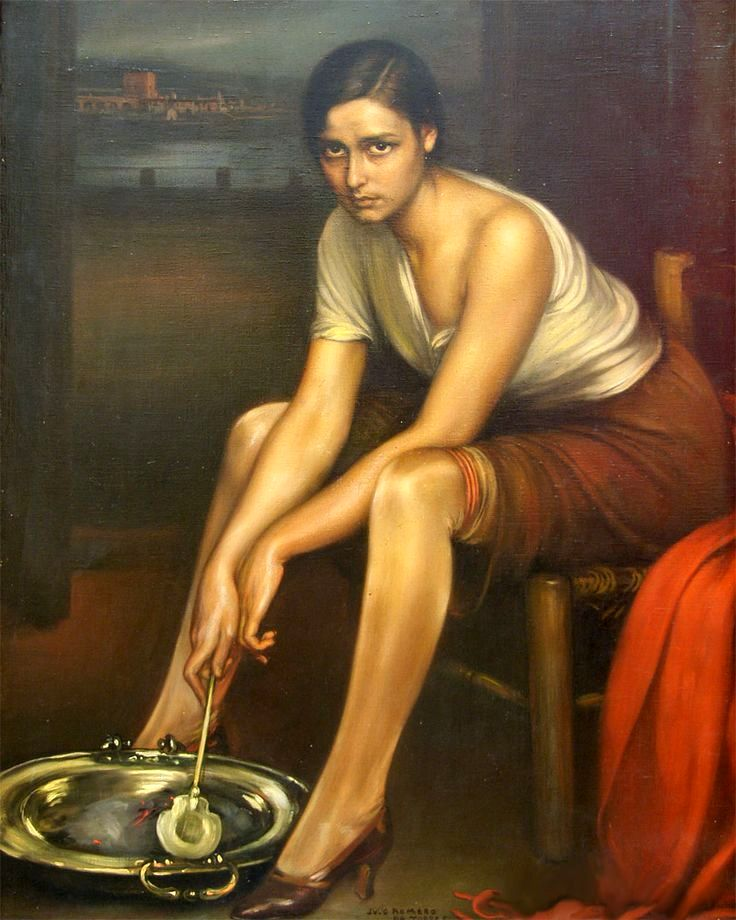
The piconera (1930), one of the last oils by Julio Romero de Torres

== Risks using the brasero ==
There are some risks attached to the traditional, charcoal-heated brasero. The embers can burn the fabric or the clothes of the users, causing a fire. Given that braseros are covered, combustion can occur with small quantities of oxygen, and instead of carbon dioxide, carbon monoxide can be generated. Carbon monoxide poisoning can kill victims in their sleep, especially in poorly ventilated rooms.

== See also ==
- Fireplace
