= Foot stove =

Type of stove

A foot stove consists of a wooden box or a metal box in a wooden frame containing embers or hot stones used for warmth throughout the 17th to 19th centuries in Northern Germany, the Netherlands, and the United States. The foot stove contained a removable bowl or tray made from pottery or metal which contained the heat source, and the box had either punched holes or an open face to release warmth. Used by placing one's on top, heat could be isolated by draping a skirt or blanket over the stove and legs.

Foot stoves were used within the home, on carriages, and in public spaces such as church buildings. When traveling, it was common to stop at homes or taverns for fresh embers. Eventually, ceramic hot water bottles became more common due to ease of use, and foot stoves fell out of common use.

Style, material, and designs varied across geographical regions, time frames, and socio-economic classes. For example, metal foot stoves were more common in the Netherlands, and stone-topped stoves more common in Germany. Foot stoves can be spotted in many 17th century Dutch painting, primarily being used by women.

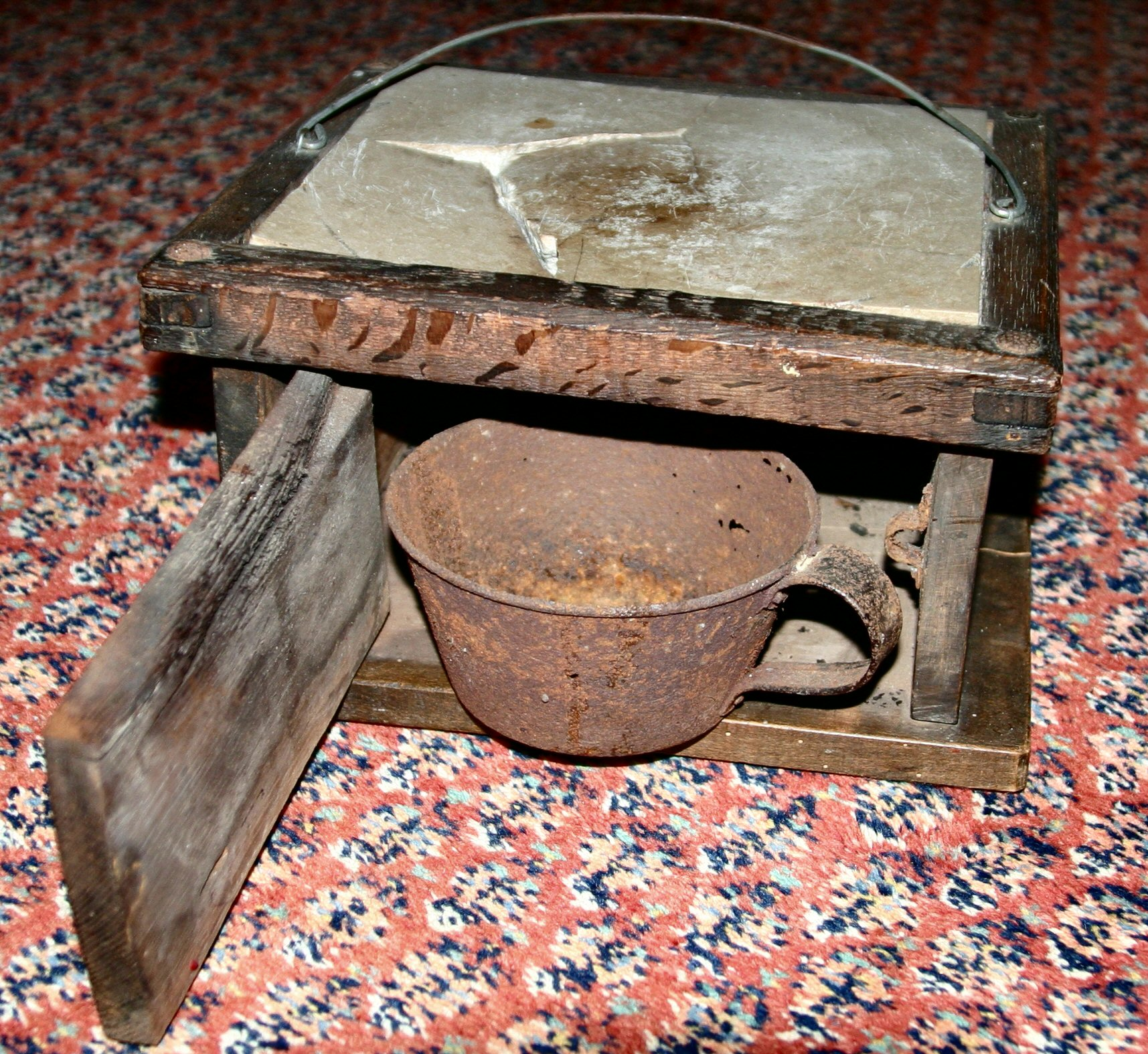
Old foot stove from Northern Germany

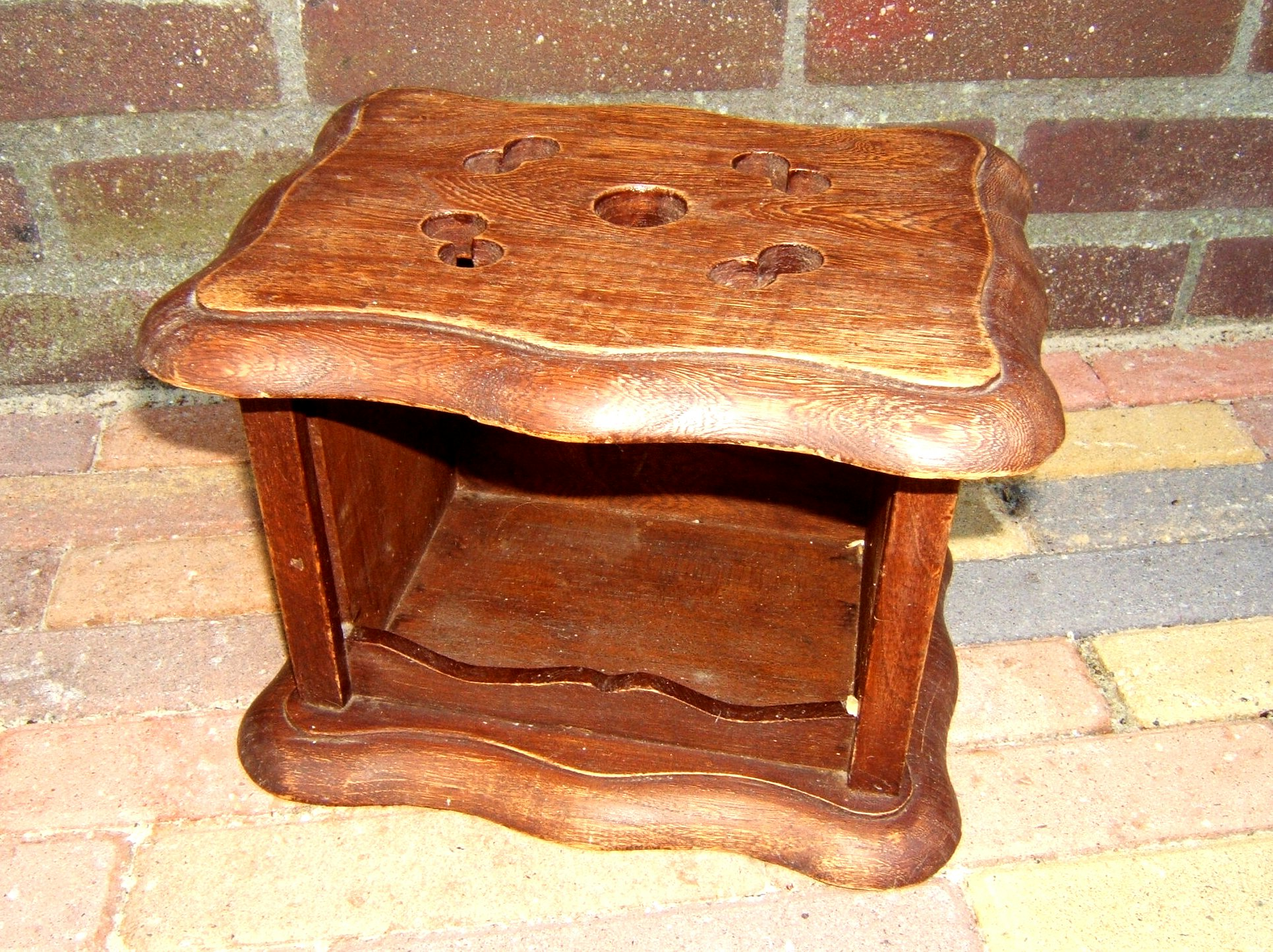
Stove from the Netherlands

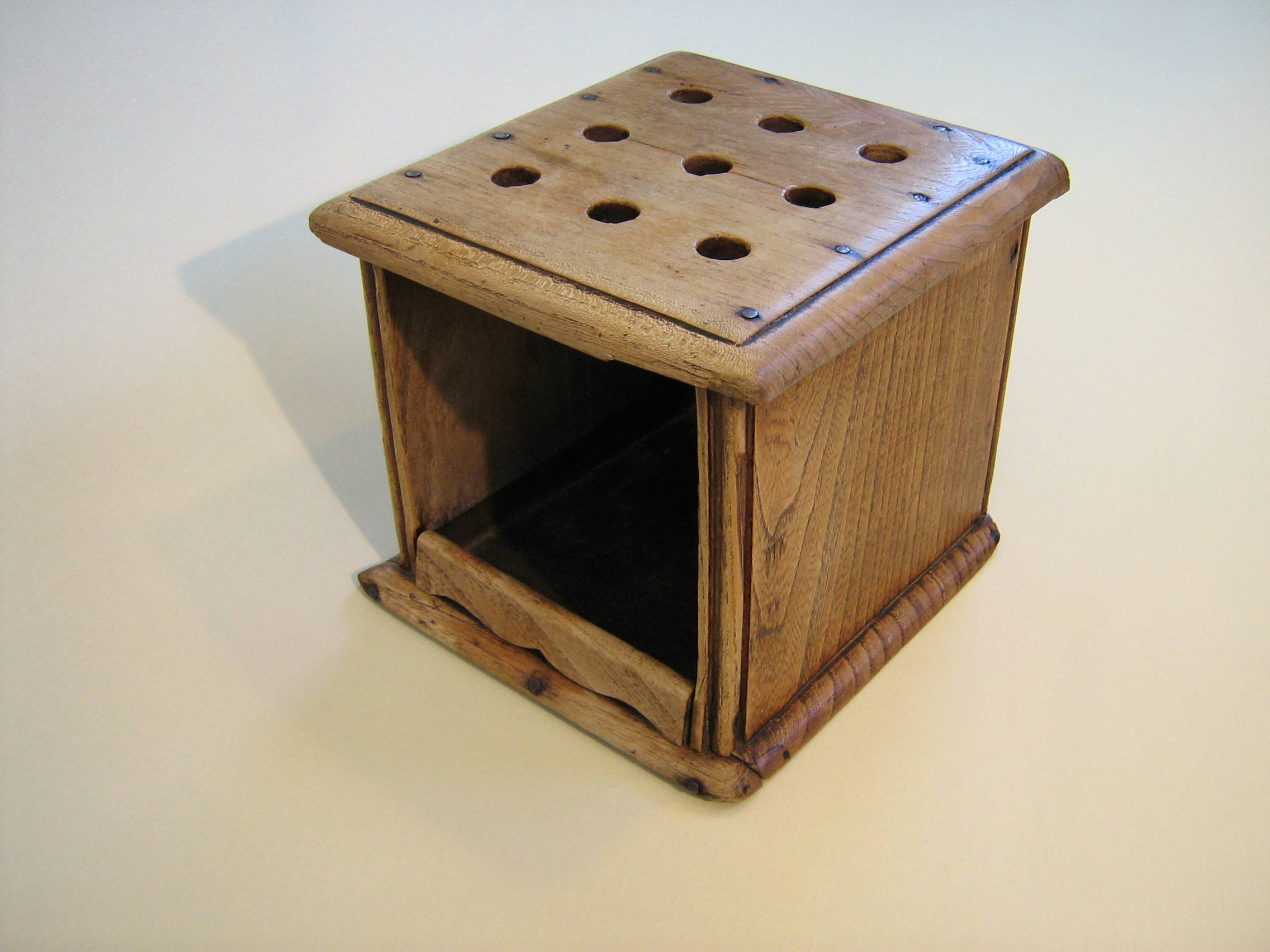
A foot stove from around 1930

== See also ==
- Korsi, a similar Iranian item
- Kotatsu, a similar Japanese item
