= Shahsevan rug =

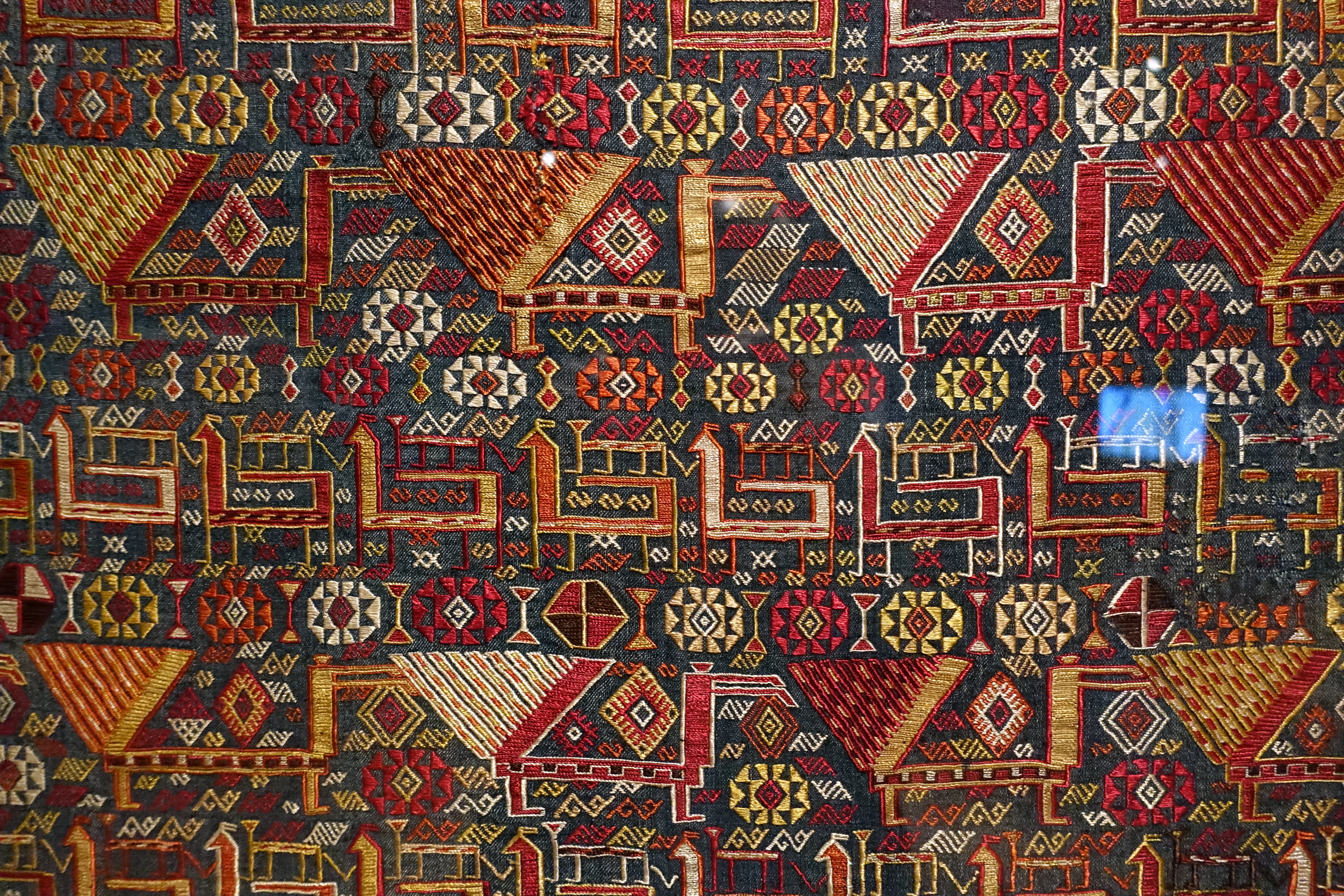
Horse cover, Shahsevan people, northwestern Iran or Caucasus, 1850-1900 AD, silk, metal-wrapped silk, view 2 - Textile Museum, George Washington University.

Shahsevan rug or Shahsevan Kilim is the Iranian Style, handmade by the Shahsevans in the Azerbaijan region of Iran.

== See also ==
- Heriz rug
- Tabriz rug
- Ardabil carpet – Famous Persian carpet
