= Korsi =

Heated table in traditional Iranian and Central Asian culture

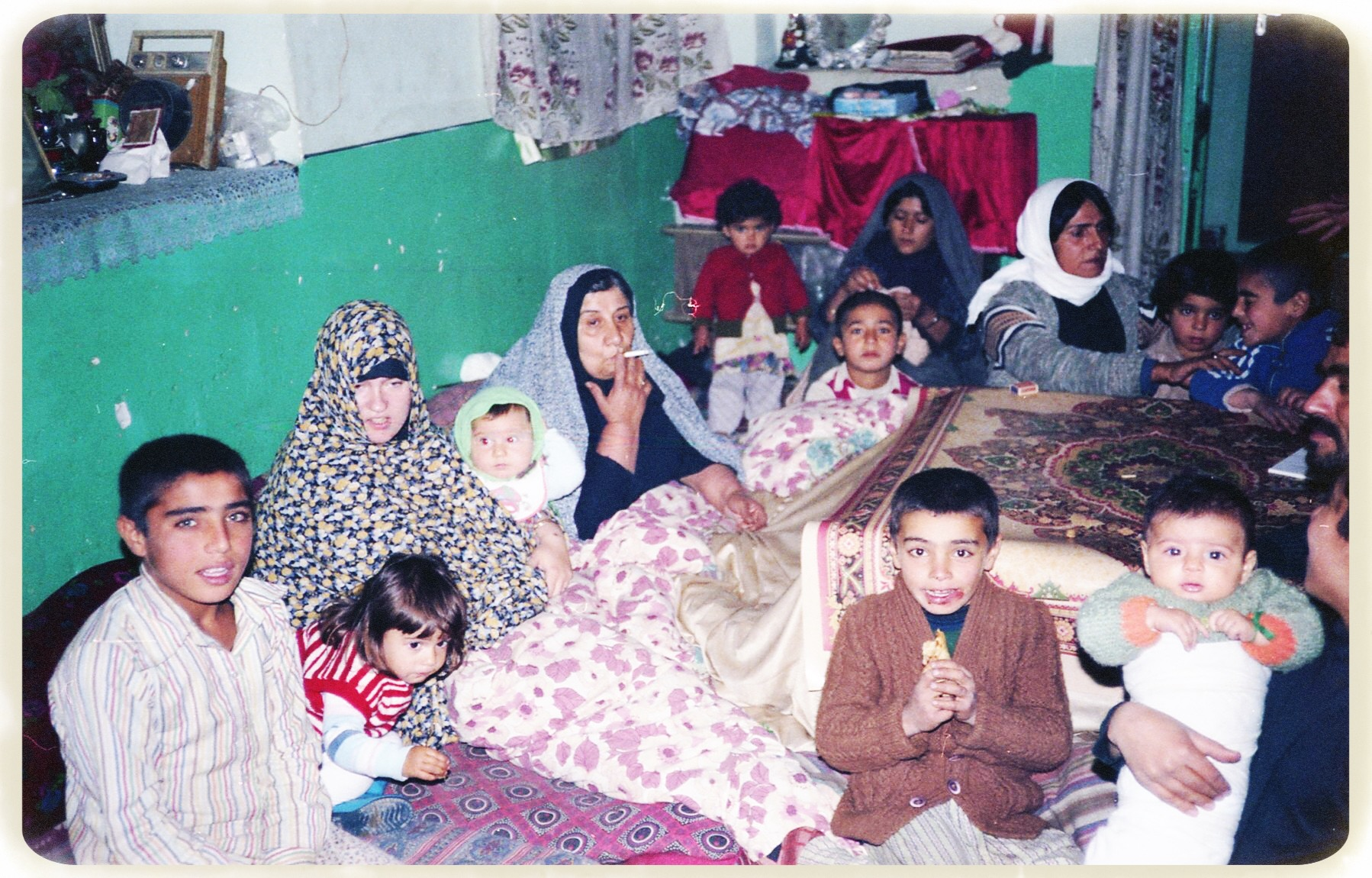
An Iranian family gathered around a korsi, 1982

A korsi (Persian: کرسی), also referred to as a sandal (Persian: صندلی, romanized: ṣandeli; Tajik: сандалӣ, romanized: sandalī; Uzbek: сандал) in Central Asia, is a type of heated table traditionally found in Iran, Afghanistan and Central Asia (particularly Tajikistan and Uzbekistan). A korsi is the traditional centre of a home in Central Asian and Iranian architecture, particularly during winter months, where it historically served as the main location for families to gather, sleep, and (in some regions) eat.

Evidence of the usage of korsi dates back to the Sasanian Empire, and they were first mentioned in writing in the 14th century. Iranian and Central Asian architecture typically included spaces specifically devoted to the korsi, and they were widespread until the 1950s–1970s, when they were largely replaced by portable gas heaters (in Iran) or, in urban areas, by municipal natural gas networks (in Soviet Central Asia). They remain common in Afghanistan and have become increasingly common in Uzbekistan in the 2020s, in response to energy shortages. Common risks of using a korsi include carbon monoxide poisoning and (among children) burns from the coals, with the latter being a health concern in Central Asia.

== History ==
The exact origin of the korsi is unclear. According to Dutch Iranologist Willem Floor, the term was first used in Persian c. 1630, though archaeological evidence of heated tables dates back to the Sasanian Empire, which existed from the third to seventh centuries. The oldest known written reference to what would later become known as the korsi is a poem by 14th-century writer Mir Sayyid Ali Hamadani, reading, in part, "Try to be like the korsi, associated with ground, endure the fire and do not wish for snow." Iranologists Seyed Mohammad Beheshti and Mehrdad Qayyoomi Bidhendi suggested in 2009 that the Japanese kotatsu, which emerged centuries after the korsi, may be descended from the korsi as a result of cultural transmission between Iran and Japan during the Mongol invasions and conquests.

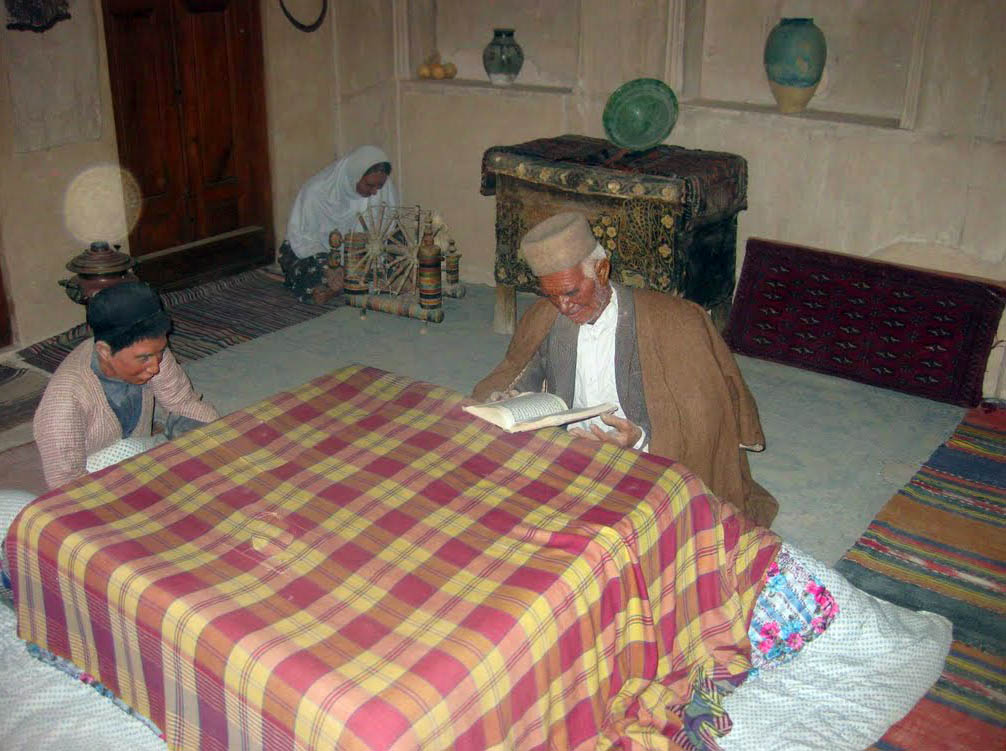
A korsi display at the Nain Museum of Anthropology. The korsi is no longer commonly used in Iran, but remains widespread in Afghanistan and Central Asia.

By the beginning of the nineteenth century, the korsi was a fixture in homes throughout Iran. Western missionaries, particularly those from the United States, considered Iranian architecture's orientation around the korsi to be an abnormality. In Iran, the first measures were taken to abandon the practice in the 1930s, when offices, large rooms and public gathering places began to adopt coal- or oil-burning heaters. Iranian homes would not begin to abandon the korsi until the 1950s, when, following the nationalisation of the Iranian oil industry, the government of Mohammad Mosaddegh began to advertise portable gas heaters as a less fuel-intensive alternative to the korsi that could easily be transported and took less effort to assemble and disassemble than a korsi. By 1969, portable gas heaters had become prolific in dowries across Iran, with a significant amount of the move being led by women, who sought to spend less time constructing the korsi. Reza Niazmand, the deputy minister of economy at the time, claimed that facilitating the usage of oil heating was fostered by American advisors to the Shah as an "abundant and cheap" source, and that gas heaters were supplied at reduced prices or for free to villages around Tehran and Qazvin throughout the 1950s. In Uzbekistan, the sandal remained widespread even in urban environments until the 1970s, when the government of the Soviet Union connected most homes to municipal natural gas networks.

Within Iran, the korsi has been described as "a thing of the past" by Floor and is no longer in widespread use since the 1970s, save for a brief period during the Iran–Iraq War as a result of shortages of oil and diesel fuel. Outside of Iran, the korsi has seen maintained its popularity (as in Afghanistan) or seen a revival in recent years. In particular, individuals living in Uzbekistan's Fergana Valley, as a result of the Central Asian energy crisis, have increasingly readopted the korsi as a cheaper alternative to other forms of heating.

== Design and usage ==
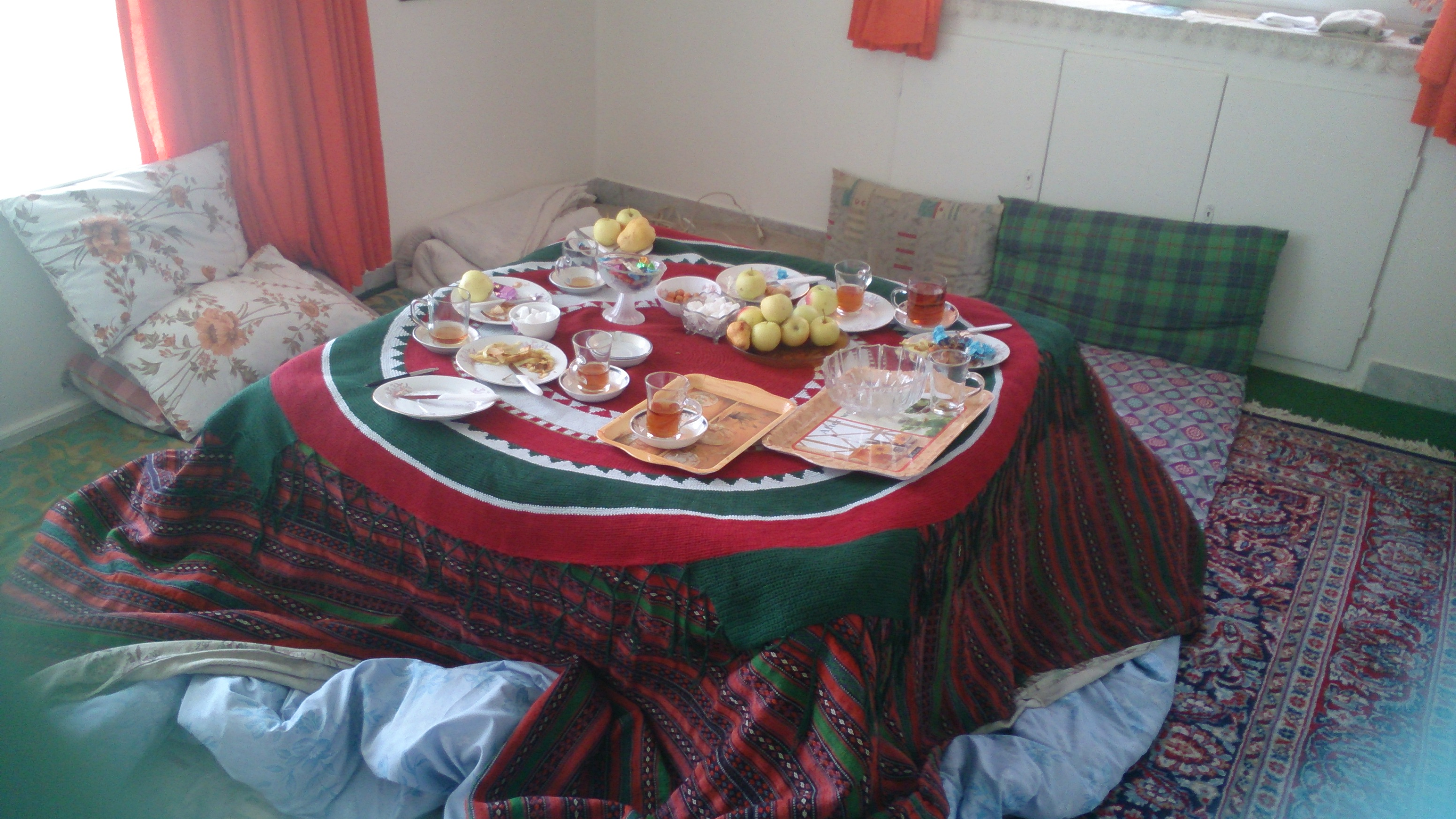
Food and drink placed on top of a modern korsi

A korsi is typically located in the centre of the living room or a specialised 'winter room' designed to capture sunlight in winter months. A low table is placed over a bowl (usually 60 cm × 60 cm × 60 cm), into which hot coals are dropped. Quilts are placed over the table and mattresses are placed around it. A Jajim textile is often used as a covering for the korsi, though among wealthier families, a special Persian carpet called a ru korsi (روکرسی) is traditionally used to prevent the quilts underneath from being stained by food or drink.

In traditional Iranian and Central Asian architecture and culture, the korsi serves as the primary location for a family to gather and sleep during winter months. In western and northwestern Iran, meals were traditionally eaten at the korsi, and cooking occasionally took place under the table. Other common activities included playing cards and board games, smoking and gossiping. Childbirths occurring in winter typically often occurred under a korsi.

Due to the absence of central heating, the korsi remains in common usage in Afghanistan, as well as in mountainous parts of Central Asia. The Central Asian energy crisis has led to increased adoption in Uzbekistan as an alternative to natural gas heating or underfloor heating. University of Oxford architecture professor Ahmadreza Foruzanmehr describes the korsi as "a good example for reducing the energy consumption by limiting the space to be warmed", noting that the family's usage of the korsi means that other parts of the home have less need for heating.

== Safety ==
There are several health risks associated with improper usage of the korsi. Due to poor hygiene and sanitation in the pre-modern period, the undersides of a korsi were often infested by vermin. The threat of carbon monoxide poisoning is also a significant risk due to the fumes from burning the coals; Floor notes that "people were advised not to sleep with their heads under the korsi" and that users were told to ensure the coals were as hot as possible. The risk of burns is also common, especially among children, and burns to feet and legs caused by improper usage of sandals is a public health problem throughout Central Asia, often being marked by burns to tissue, subcutaneous fat, muscles and bones as well as to the skin. The continued usage of coals, as opposed to modern electric heating systems, contributes to the risk of injury.

== See also ==
- Foot stove, a similar Dutch item
- Kotatsu, a similar Japanese item
