= Pirot carpet =

Rug variety from Pirot, Serbia

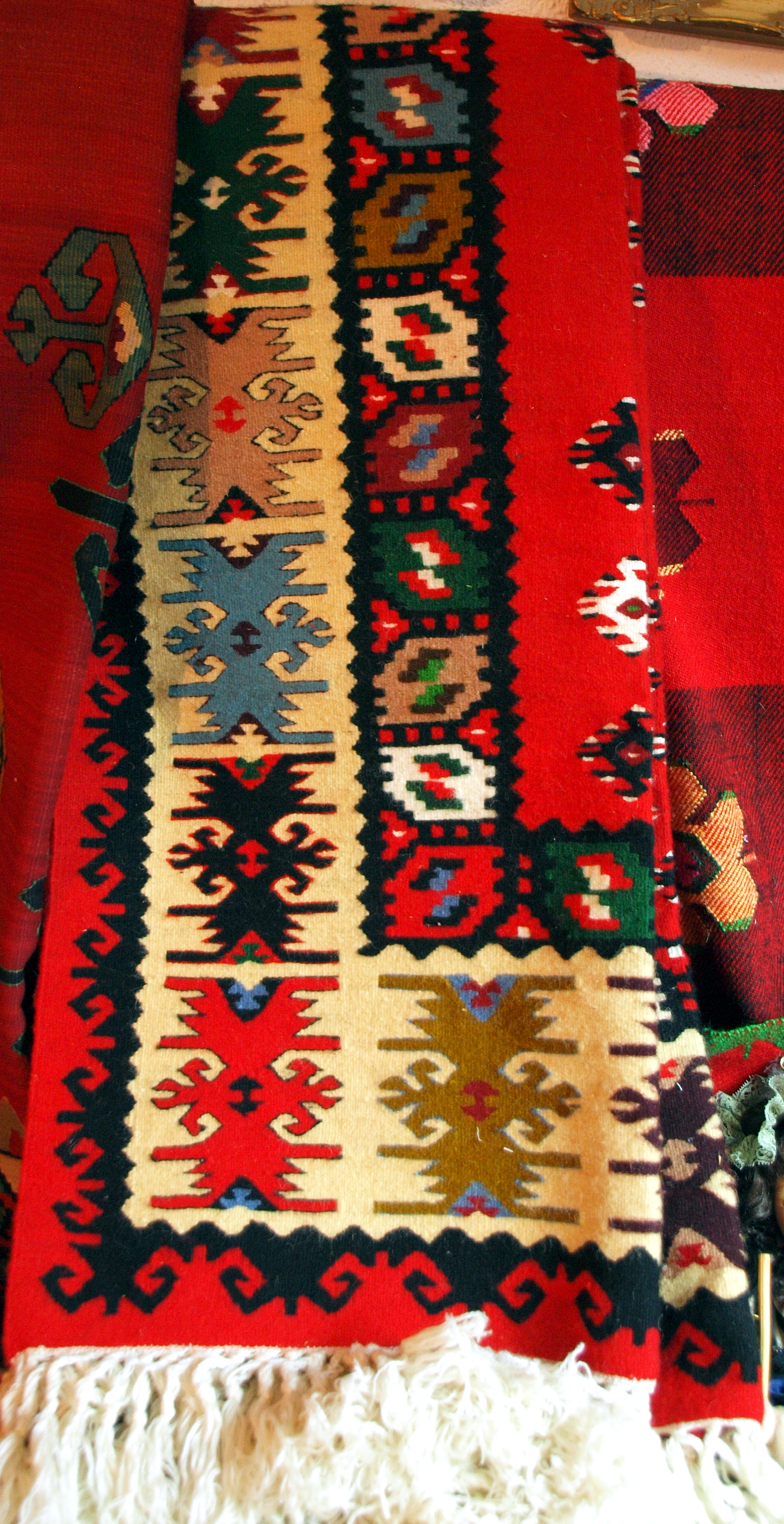
Pirot Ćilim with the ornament Rašićeva ploča.

Pirot rug, Pirot carpet or Pirot ćilim (Serbian Cyrillic: Пиротски ћилим, romanized: Pirotski ćilim) refers to a variety of flat tapestry- woven rugs traditionally produced in Pirot, a town in southeastern Serbia. The Pirot kilim is often referred as one of the national symbols of Serbia. While Pirot is the historic center for the production of this carpet style, the Pirot rug is part of a broader history of Balkan rug making, with Pirot style carpets traditionally found across the region, from modern-day Bosnia to Turkey. The Turkish name for the town of Pirot, Şarköy, has also given the name "sarkoy" or "sharkoy" to carpets of the same style produced in modern-day Turkey, while the adjacent town of Chiprovtsi across the border in Bulgaria has become recognized as another important center for this same carpet tradition.

Pirot kilim making is the skill of making rugs on a vertical loom. The skill is used in the production of woollen kilims, decorated with various geometric, vegetal and figural ornaments. Today's authentic tapestry has developed under the influence of Oriental weaving. Rug-making in Pirot is included on the list Intangible cultural heritage of Serbia. Together with Chiprovtsi carpets, the Pirot kilims are considered as part of a regional center of carpet weaving native to this mountain region of Eastern Serbia and Western Bulgaria. An example of the patterns from the last periods is the Model of Rašič (Serbian Cyrillic: Рашичева шара, romanized: Rašičeva šara) which was based on ćilim brought by Serbian general Mihailo Rašič.

Pirot kilims with some 122 ornaments and 96 different types have been protected by geographical indication in 2002. They are one of the most important traditional handicrafts in Serbia. In the late 19th century and up to the Second World War, Pirot kilims have been frequently used as insignia of Serbian royalty. This tradition was revived in 2011 when Pirot kilims were reintroduced for state ceremonies in Serbia.

== Overview ==
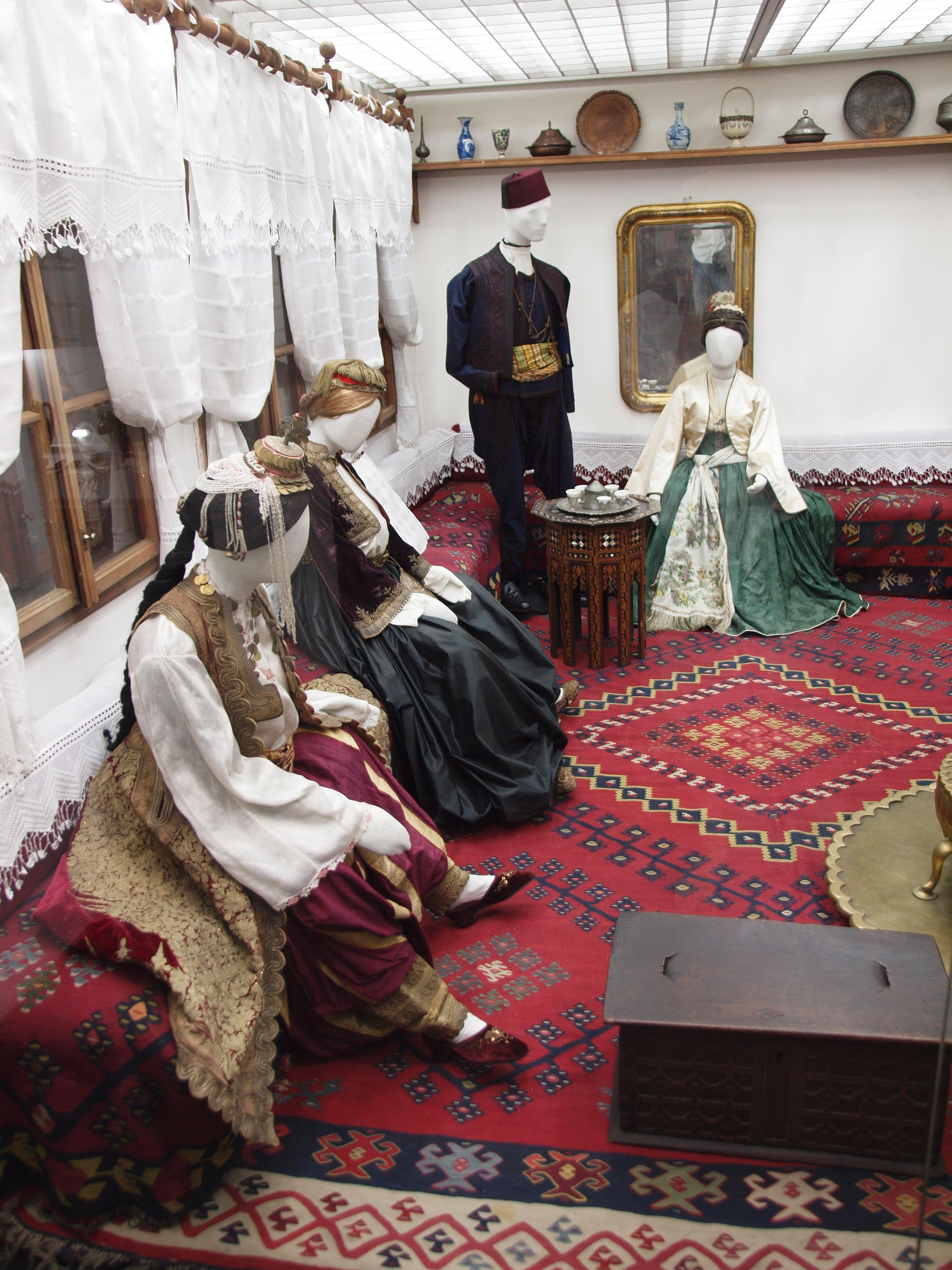
Exhibition in Ethnographic Museum in Belgrade

Carpet weaving in Pirot dates back to the Middle Ages. One of the first mentions of the Pirot kilim in written sources date to 1565, when it was said that the šajkaši boats on the Danube and Drava were covered with Pirot kilims.

Pirot was once the most important rug-making centre in the Balkans. Pirot is located on the historical main highway which linked central Europe with Constantinople. An interesting characteristic of some Pirot style carpets is the inscription of the Serbian or Bulgarian weaver and the year in which the carpet was woven.

Today many classical examples of Pirot kilims can be found throughout Bosnia, Bulgaria, Croatia, Montenegro, Serbia, Turkey, and in many other international collections. One of the chief qualities are the effects achieved through the choice and arrangement of colours. In the beginning of the 19th century plant dyes were replaced by aniline colourings.

"The best product of the country is the Pirot carpet, worth about ten shillings a square metre. The designs are extremely pretty, and the rugs, without being so heavy as the Persian, or so ragged and scant in the web and woof as Caramanian, wear for ever. The manufacture of these is almost entirely confined to Pirot,"

From Pirot's old Turkish signification as Şarköy stems the traditional trade name of the rugs as Şarköy-kilims. Stemming from the homonym to the present-day Turkish settlement of Şarköy in Thrace, which had no established rug making tradition, Şarköys are often falsely ascribed to originate from Thrace. Also in the rug selling industry, Şarköy are mostly labeled as being of oriental or Turkish origin as to easier sell them to non familiar customers as they prefer rug with putative oriental origin. In fact, Şarköys have been established from the 17th century in the region of the Western Balkan or Stara Planina mountains in the towns of Pirot, Berkovitsa, Lom, Chiprovtsi and Samokov. Later they were also produced in Knjaževac and Caribrod.

== Cultural organizations ==
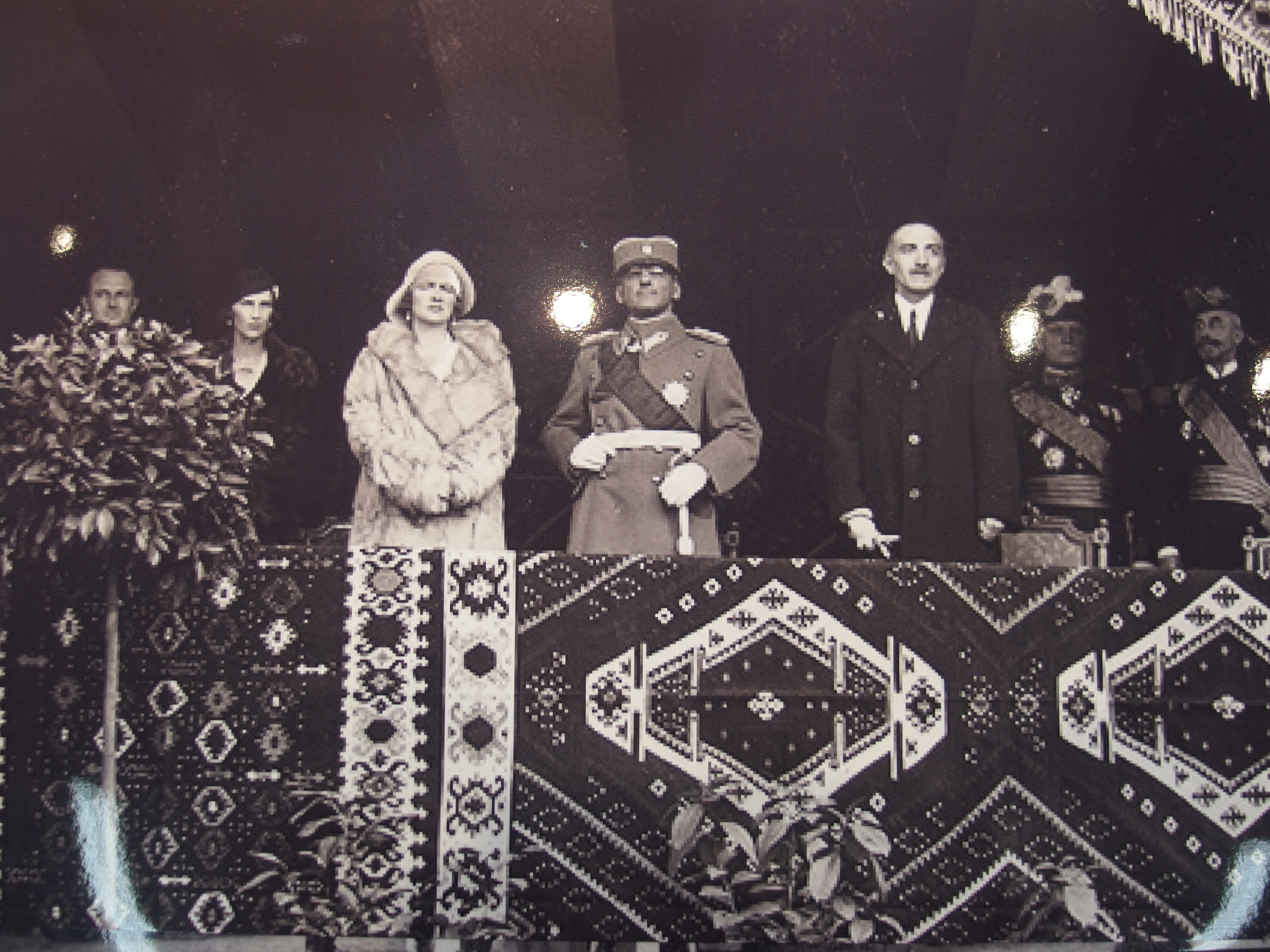
Pirot rugs (Bombe u pregradama and Rašičeva šara) seen in front of the king Alexander I of Yugoslavia and the queen Maria at the inauguration of the Monument of Gratitude to France in Belgrade (1930).

- Association "Grlica"
- "Association of Preserving and Development of [the] Pirot Carpet", founded 1995
- "Pirot Carpet Cooperative" or "Pirot Carpet Zadruga", founded 1902
- "Damsko srce"

== Collections ==
Serbian

- The Ethnographic Museum (Belgrade), has a small collection of carpets on display.
- The Museum of Applied Art has a valuable collection of ca. 120 carpets from Pirot, dating to the late 18th to the mid-20th century.

International

- British Museum (2 rugs, as of 2013)

== Ornaments ==
Pirot kilims with some 122 ornaments and 96 different types have been protected by geographical indication since 2002.

== Gallery ==
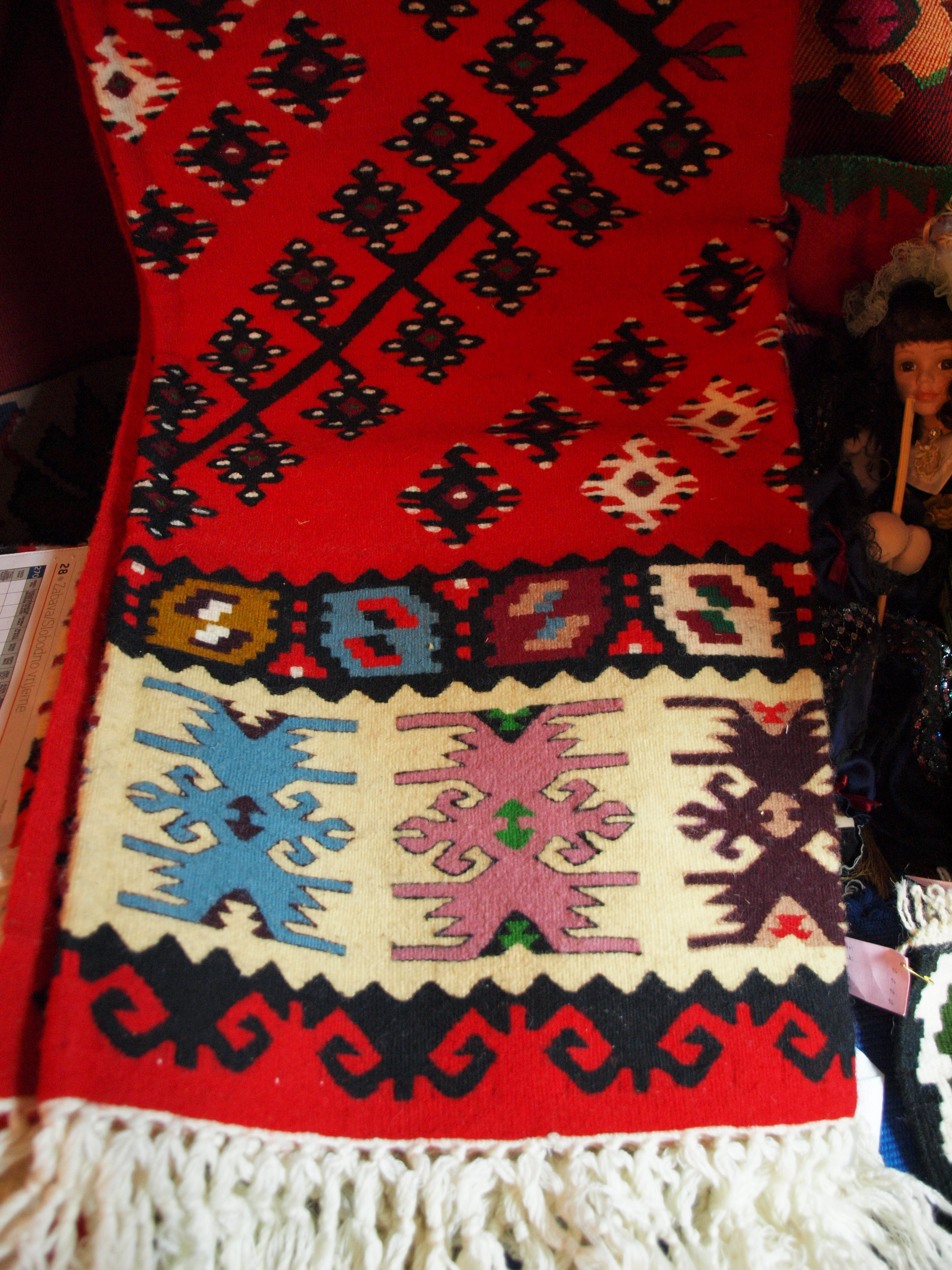
Pirot rug Venci

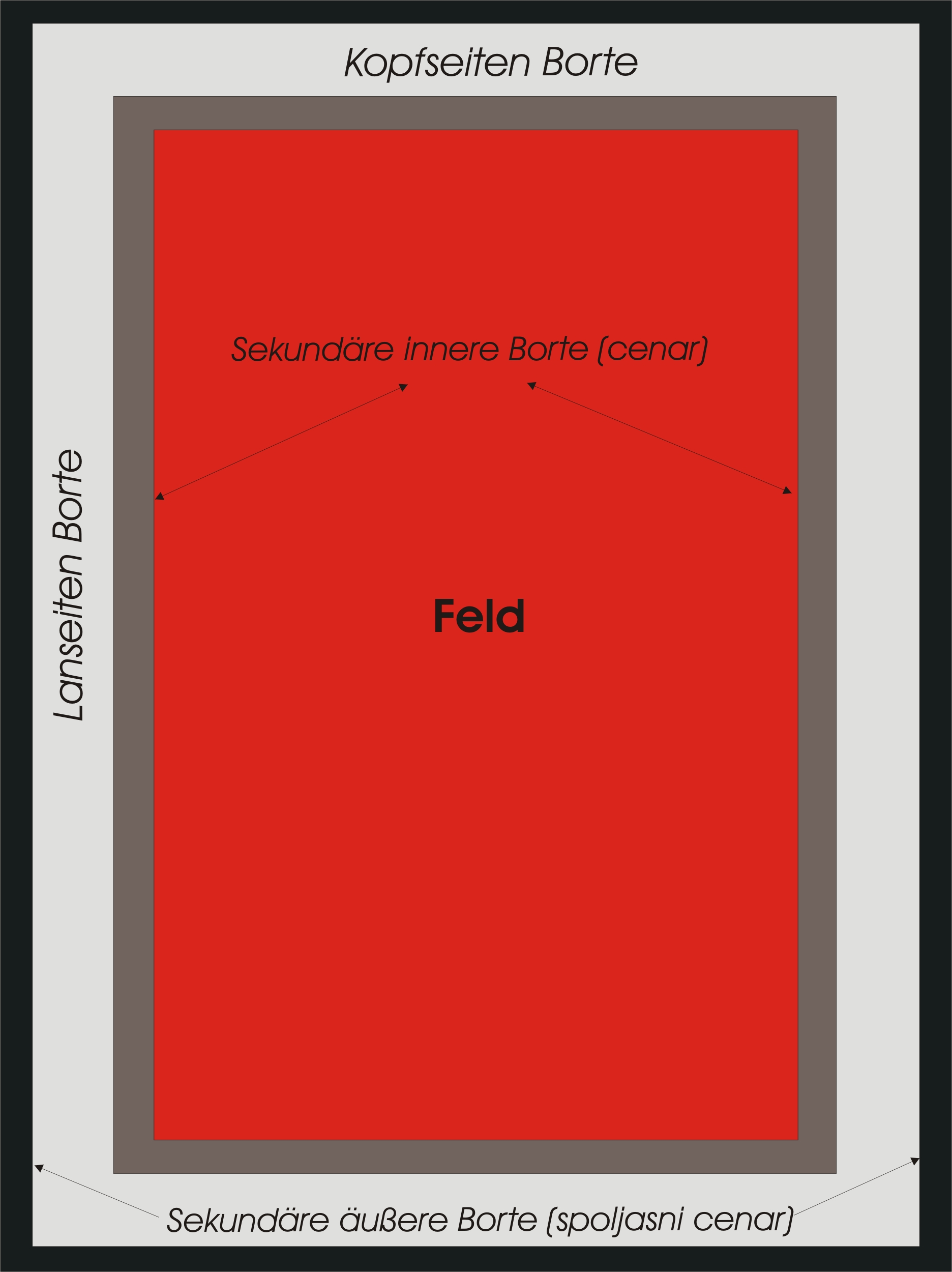
Scheme of a Pirot rug

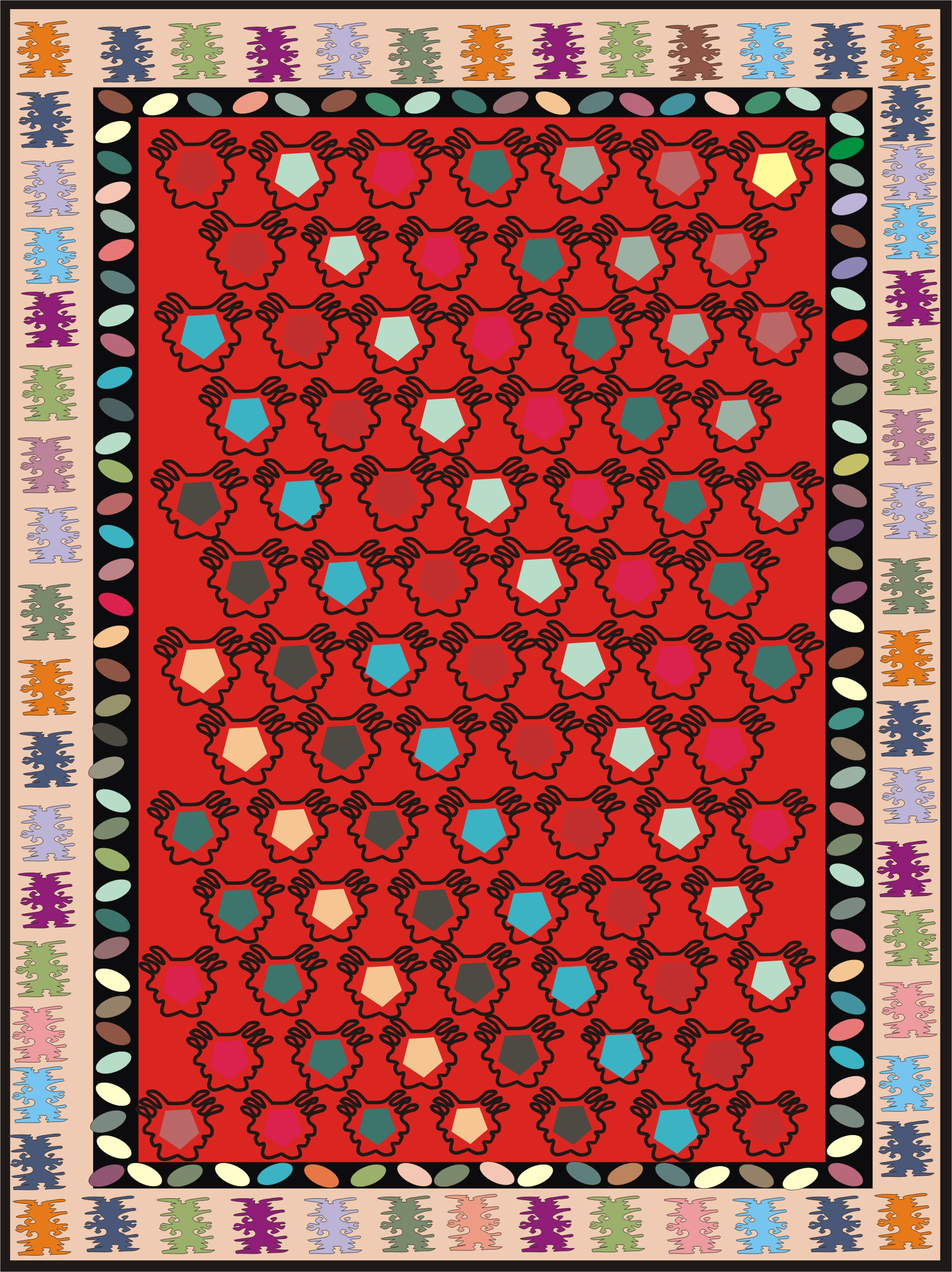
Scheme of the Razbacani đulovi type

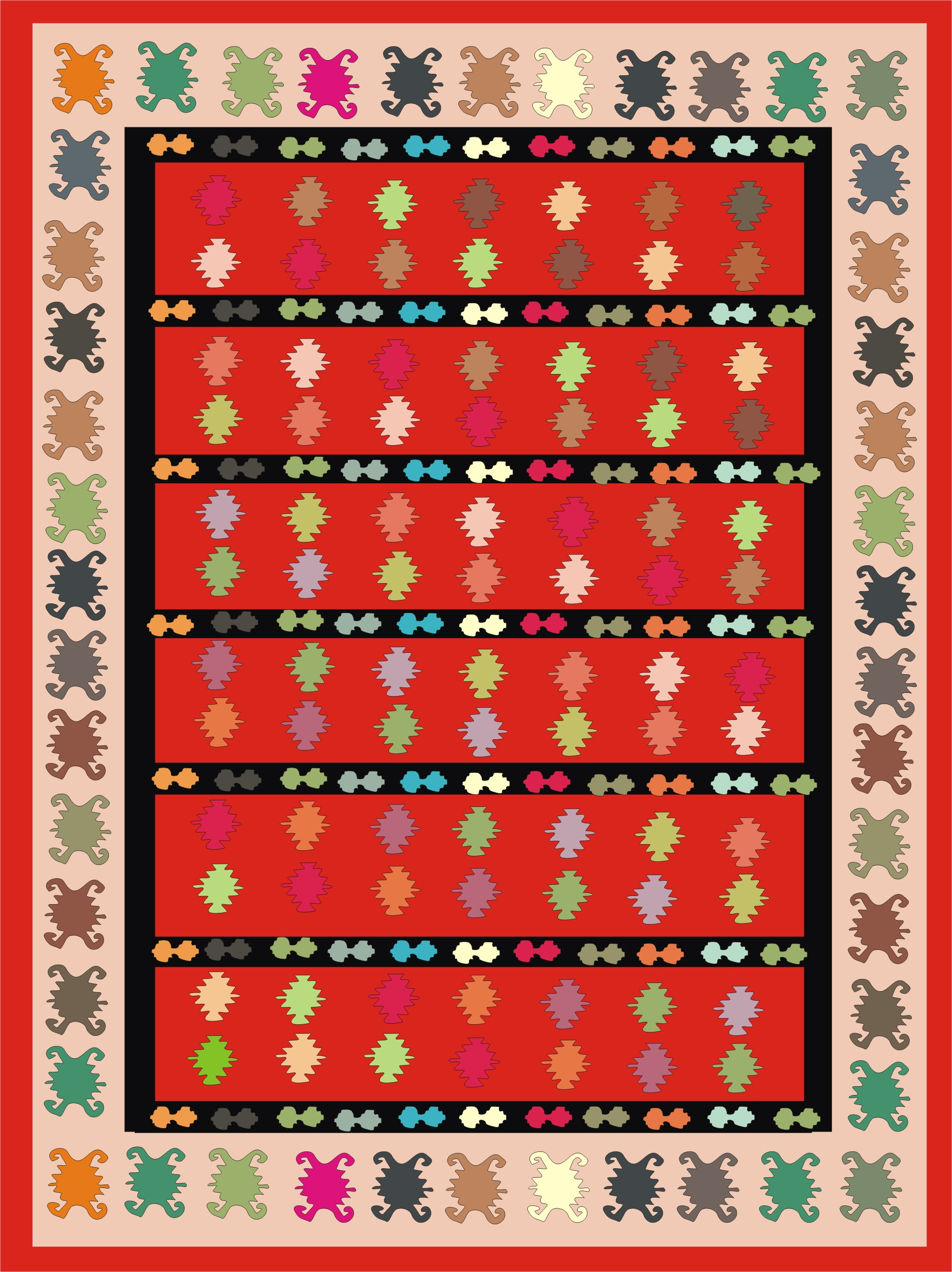
Scheme of the Bombe u pregradama type. Ornaments at the border are called kornjača (turtle).

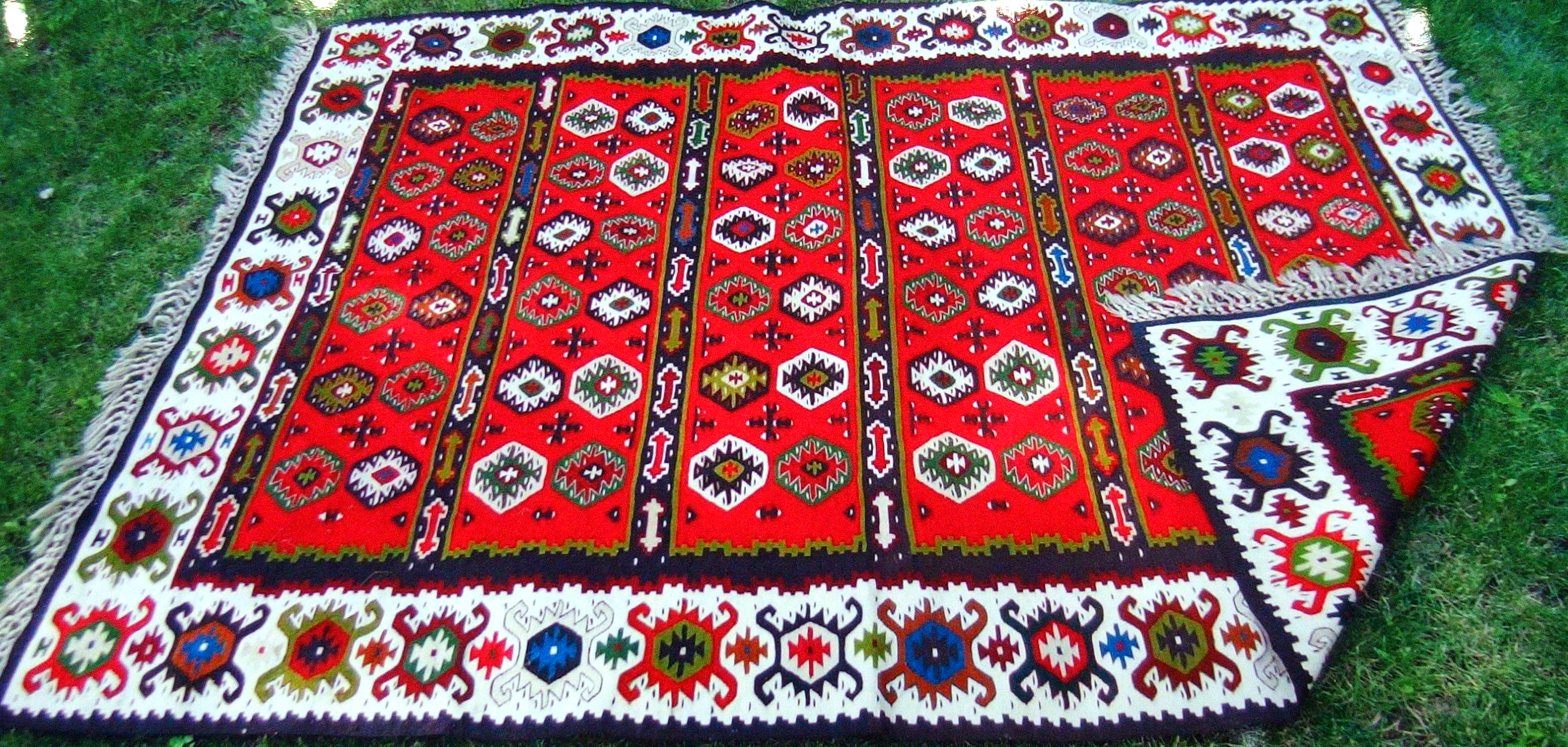
bombe u pregradama

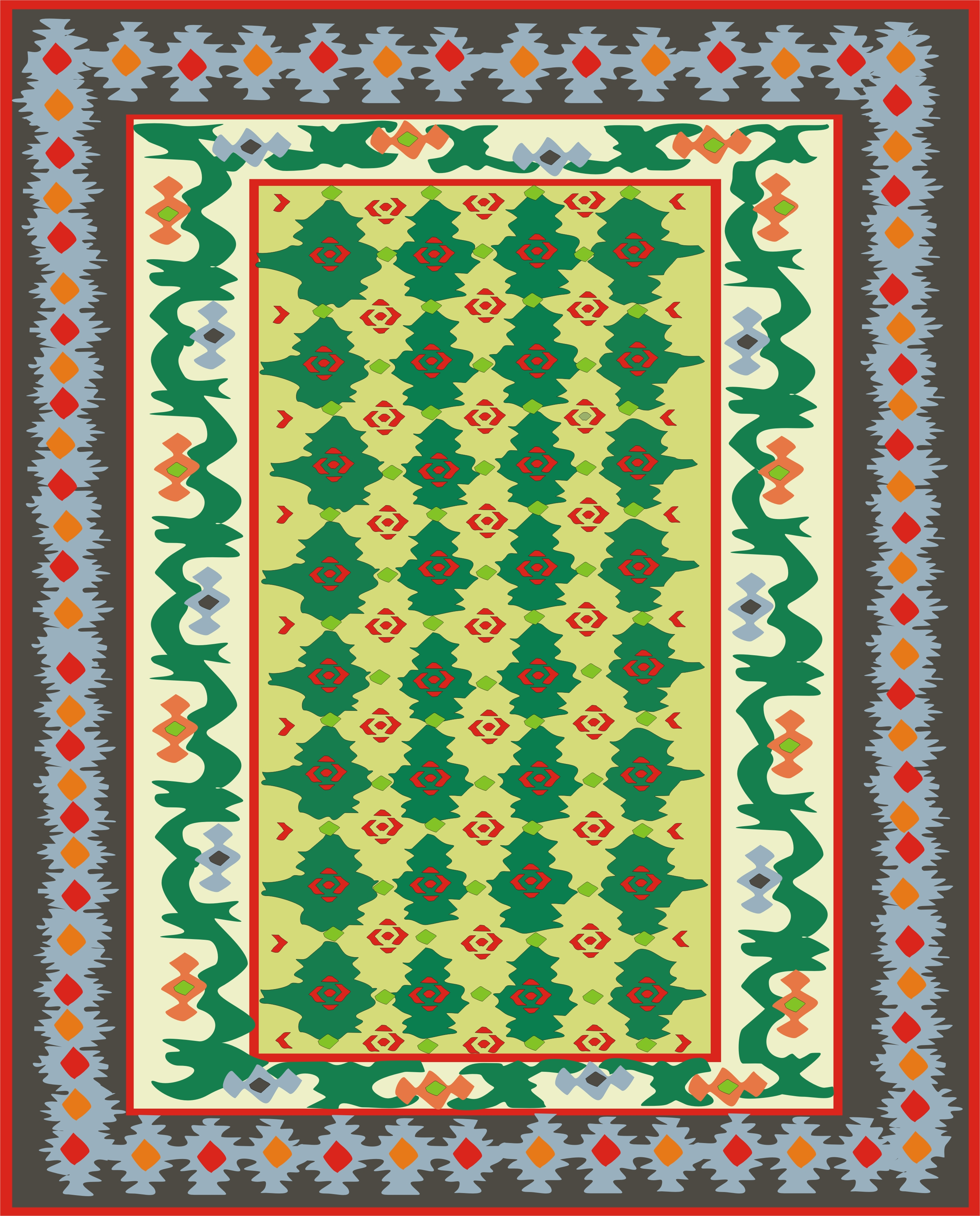
Bosanska šara

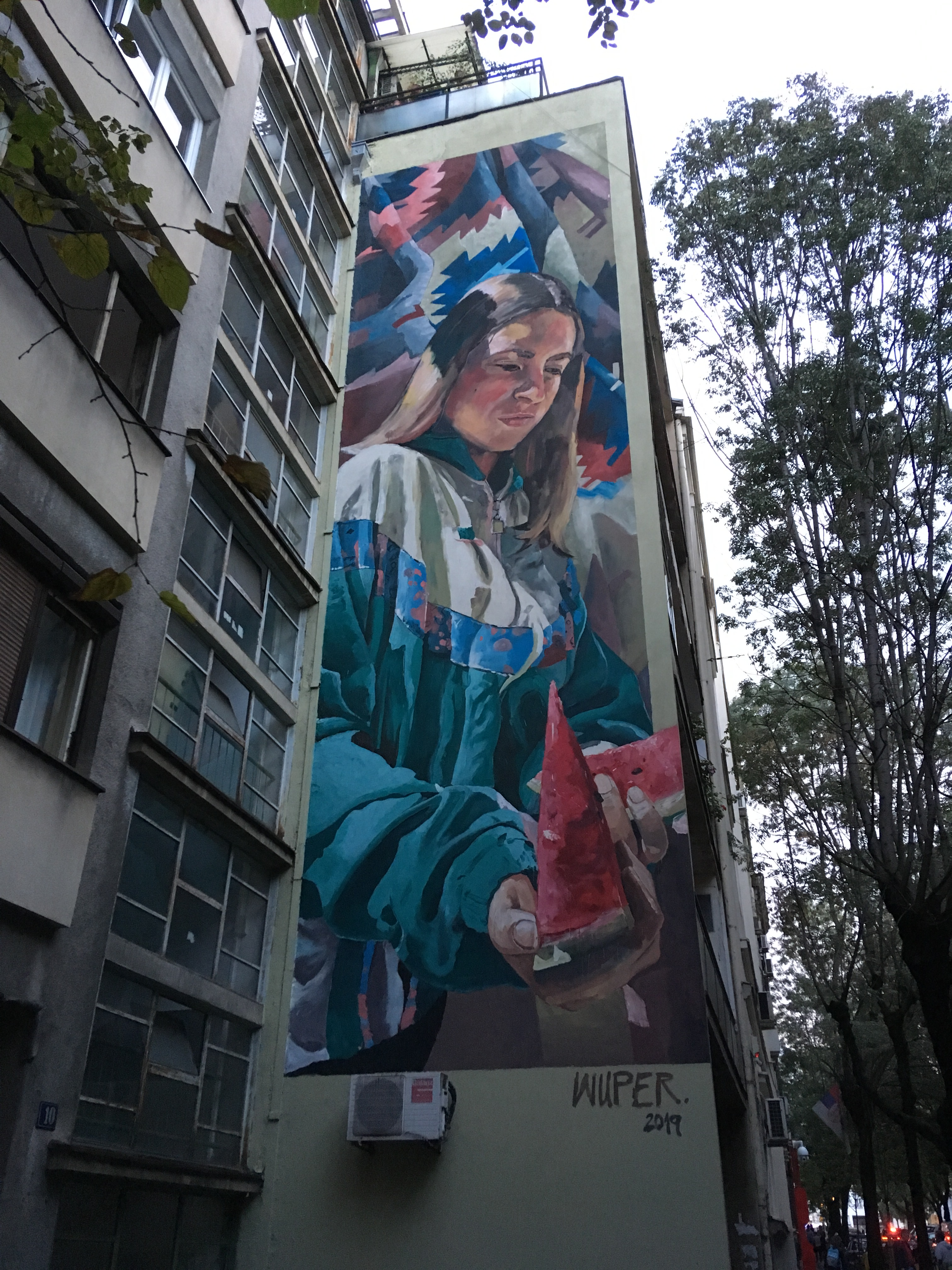
A mural with Pirot rug-inspired ornaments

== Notable people ==
- Darinka Petković (1868–1932), sister of merchant Kosta Petković

== See also ==
- Chiprovtsi carpet
- Zmijanje embroidery

== Annotations ==
1. The Serbian name is Pirotski ćilim (Пиротски ћилим); in English "Pirot carpet", "Pirot kilim" and "Pirot rug"; in Turkish "Şarköy kilimleri". The carpet varieties are also referred to as "Thracian", "Serbian" or "Sarköy" rugs, in foreign literature.
