= Kilim =

Flat tapestry-woven carpet

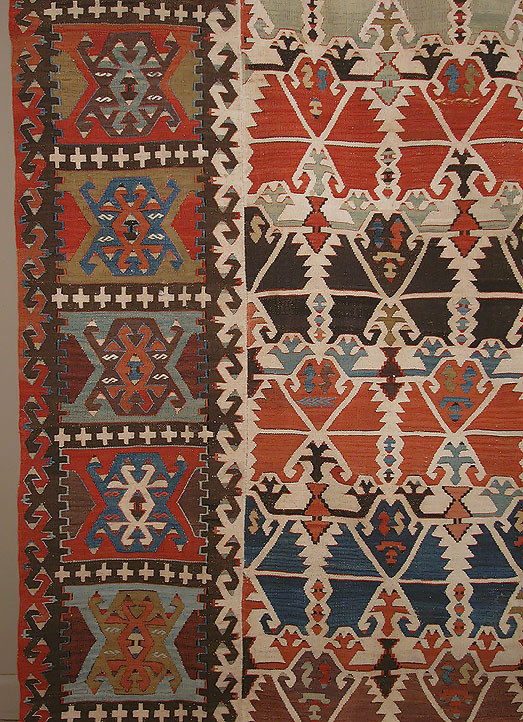
Hotamis Kilim (detail), central Anatolia, early 19th century

A kilim (Persian: گلیم gilīm; Turkish: kilim) is a flat tapestry-woven carpet or rug traditionally produced in Turkey, Iran, Azerbaijan, the Balkans, and some neighbouring regions.

Kilims can be purely decorative or can function as prayer rugs.

== Etymology ==
The word kilim comes from Persian گلیم gilīm 'mat, blanket, bed or floor covering', which is cognate with the Aramaic-Syriac word גלימא galīmā, galīmtā, which means the same thing. Both are borrowed from Ancient Greek κάλυμμα kálymma 'cover', from the verb καλύπτω kalýptō 'to cover or conceal'.

== History ==
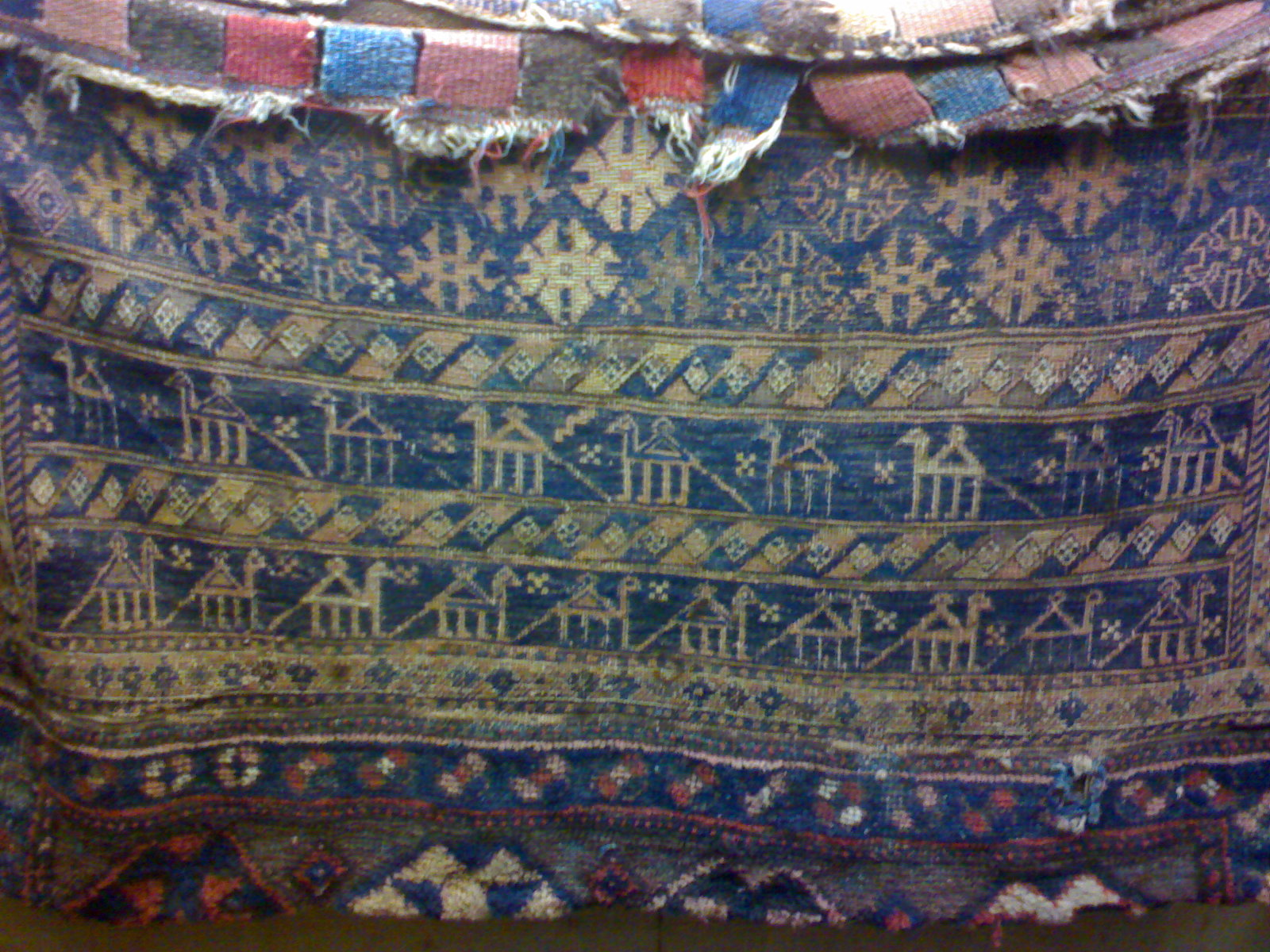
Gilim Iran museum

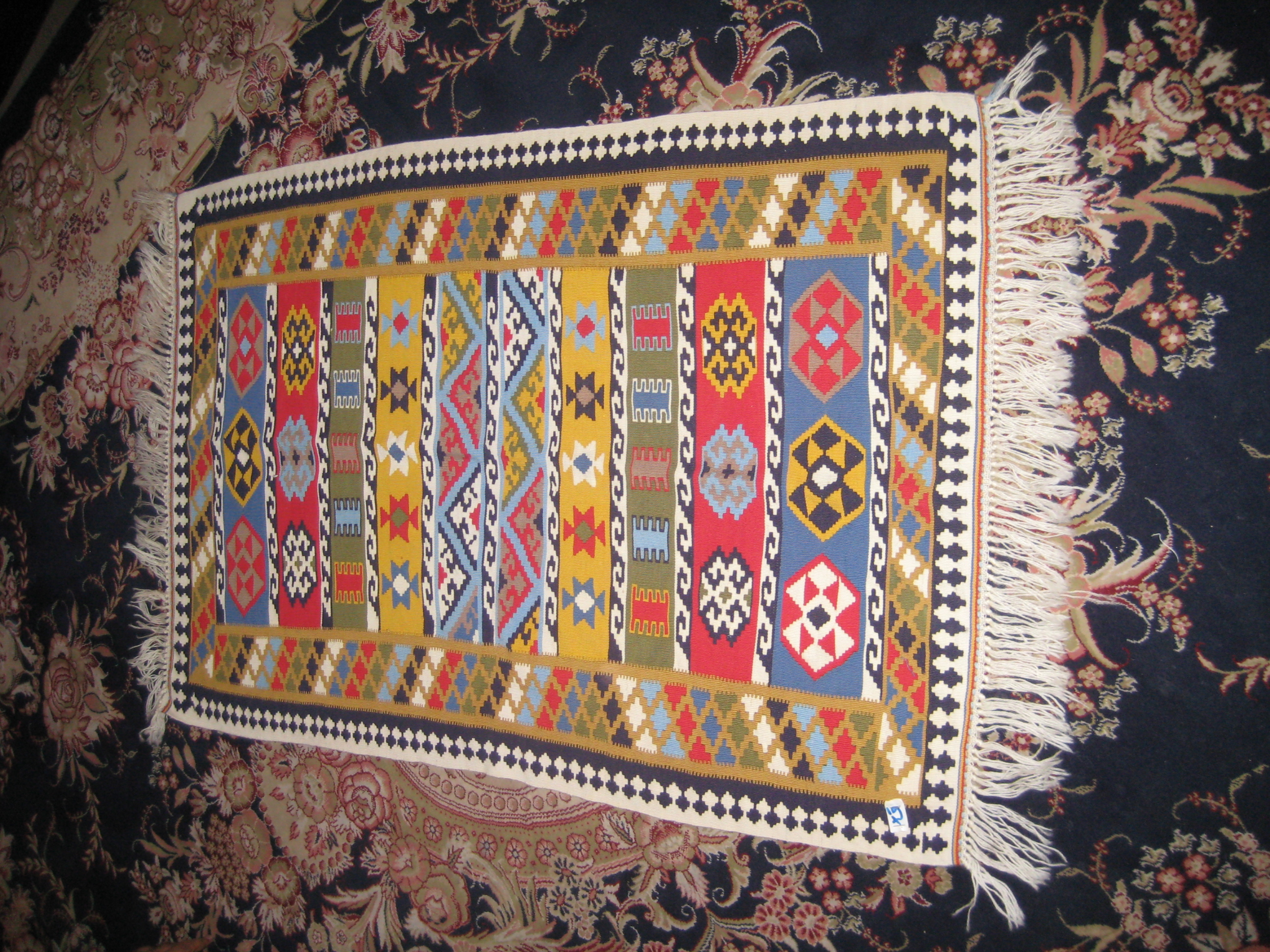
Modern galim

Like pile carpets, kilim have been produced since ancient times. The explorer Mark Aurel Stein found kilims dating to at least the fourth or fifth century CE in Hotan, China:

As kilims are much less durable than rugs that have a pile to protect the warp and weft, it is not surprising that few of great age remain.... The weave is almost identical with that of modern kilims, and has about fourteen threads of warp and sixteen threads of weft to the inch. The pattern consists of narrow stripes of blue, green, brownish yellow, and red, containing very small geometric designs. With this one exception, so peculiarly preserved, there are probably very few over a century old.

== Weaving technique ==
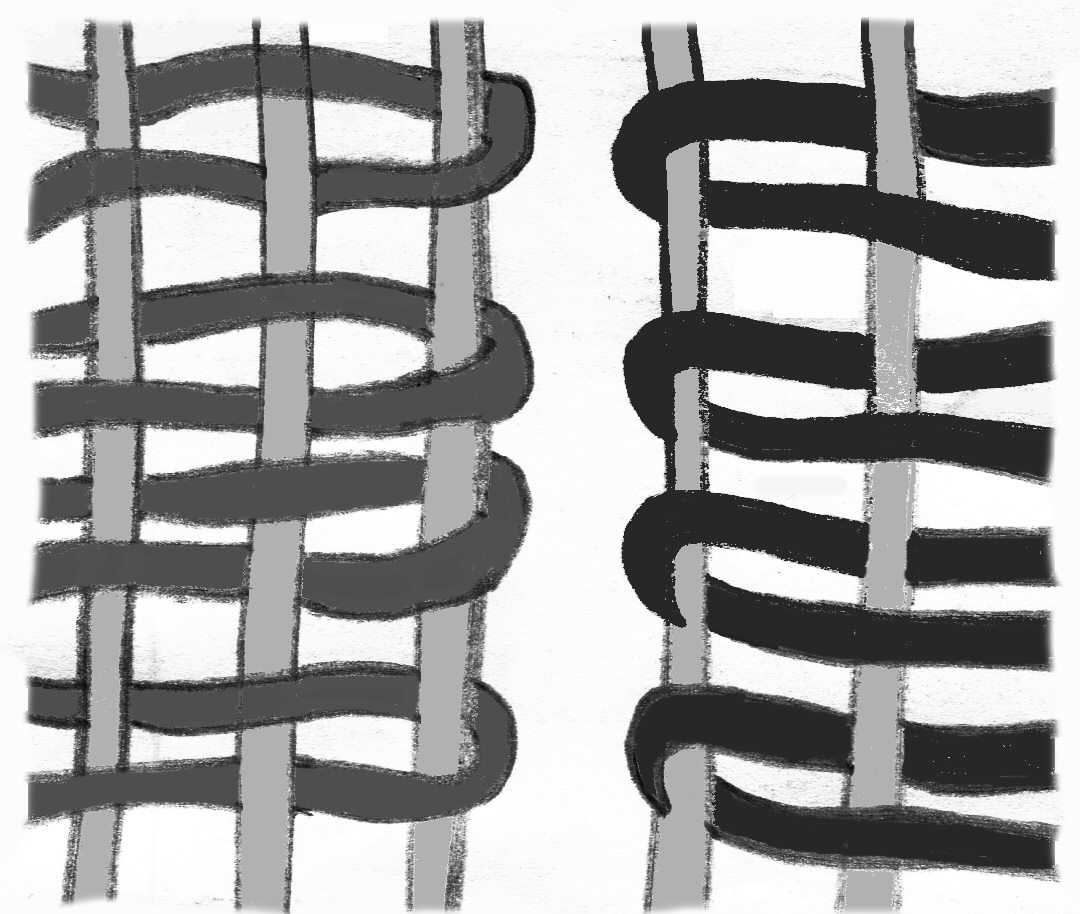
Diagram of kilim slit weave technique, showing how the weft threads of each color are wound back from the color boundary, leaving a slit

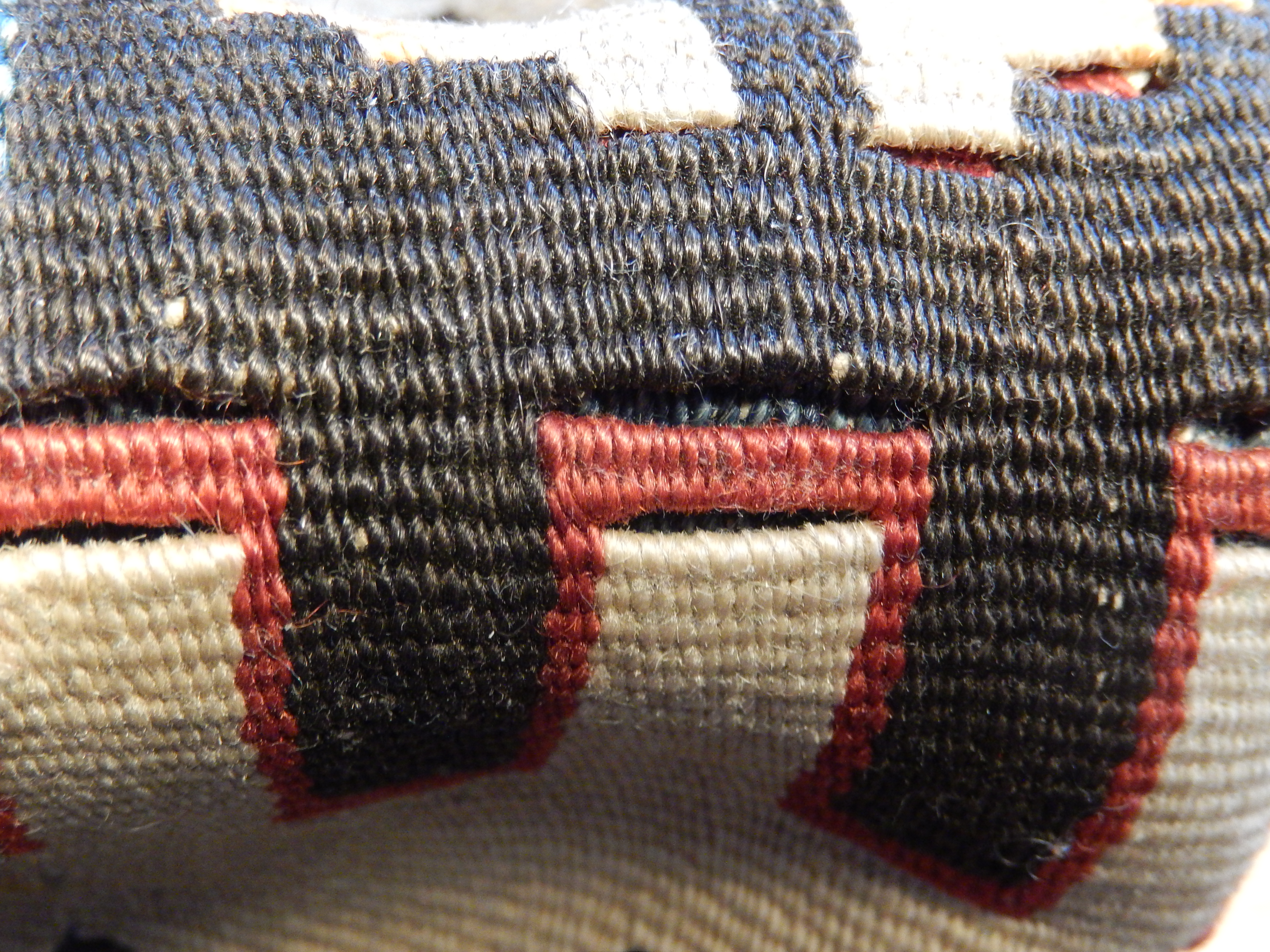
Turkish kilim, folded to show slits between different coloured areas

Kilims are produced by tightly interweaving the warp and weft strands of the weave to produce a flat surface with no pile. Kilim weaves are tapestry weaves, technically weft-faced plain weaves, that is, the horizontal weft strands are pulled tightly downward so that they hide the vertical warp strands.

When the end of a color boundary is reached, the weft yarn is wound back from the boundary point. Thus, if the boundary of a field is a straight vertical line, a vertical slit forms between the two different color areas where they meet. For this reason, most kilims can be classed as "slit woven" textiles. The slits are beloved by collectors, as they produce very sharp-etched designs, emphasizing the geometry of the weave. Weaving strategies for avoiding slit formation, such as interlocking, produce a more blurred design image.

The weft strands, which carry the visible design and color, are almost always wool, whereas the hidden warp strands can be either wool or cotton. The warp strands are only visible at the ends, where they emerge as the fringe. This fringe is usually tied in bunches, to ensure against loosening or unraveling of the weave.

== Motifs ==
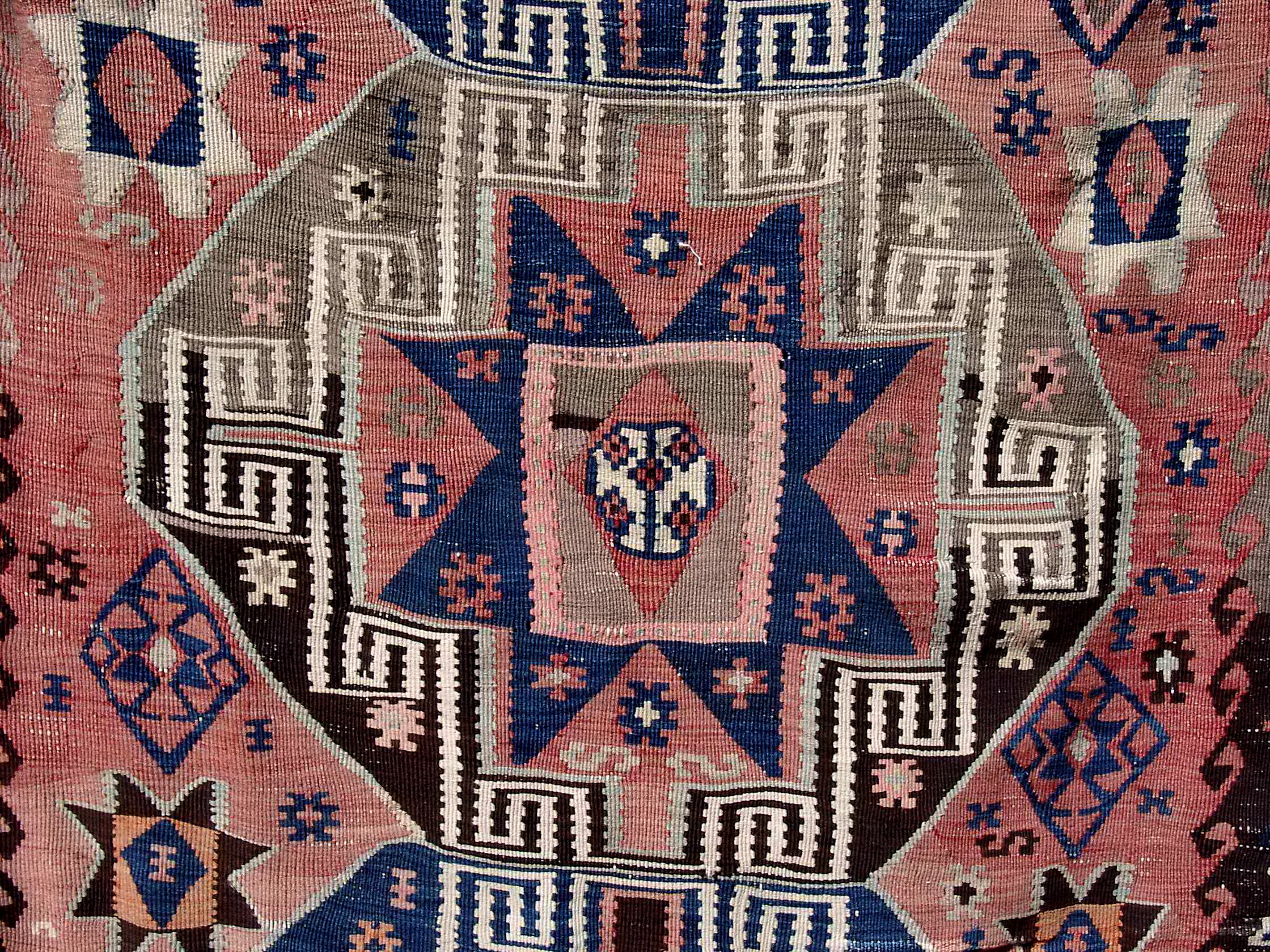
Detail of a Turkish kilim, illustrating usage of several kilim motifs

Many motifs are used in Turkish kilims, each with many variations. A few examples are illustrated here, with meanings as described by Güran Erbek in Kilim. A widely used motif is the elibelinde, a stylized female figure representing motherhood and fertility. Other motifs express the tribal weavers' desires for protection of their families' flocks from wolves with the wolf's mouth or the wolf's foot motif (Turkish: Kurt ağzı, Kurt izi), or for safety from the sting of the scorpion (Turkish: Akrep). Several motifs hope for the safety of the weaver's family from the evil eye (Turkish:Kem göz and Nazarlık for the motif), which could be divided into four with a cross symbol (Turkish: Haç), or averted with the symbol of a hook (Turkish: Çengel), a human eye (Turkish: Göz), or an amulet (Turkish: Muska; often, a triangular package containing a sacred verse). Such an amulet woven into a rug is not a picture of the thing itself: it actually is an amulet, believed to confer protection by its presence.

Other motifs symbolise fertility, as with the trousseau chest motif (Turkish: Sandıklı), or the explicit fertility (Turkish: Bereket, [beɾeket]) motif. The motif for running water (Turkish: Su yolu) similarly depicts the resource literally. The desire to tie a family or lovers together may be depicted with a fetter motif (Turkish: Bukaǧı). Several other motifs represent the desire for good luck and happiness, as for instance the bird (Turkish: Kuş) and the star or Solomon's seal (Turkish: Yıldız). The oriental symbol of yin and yang is used for love and unison (Turkish: Aşk ve birleşim).

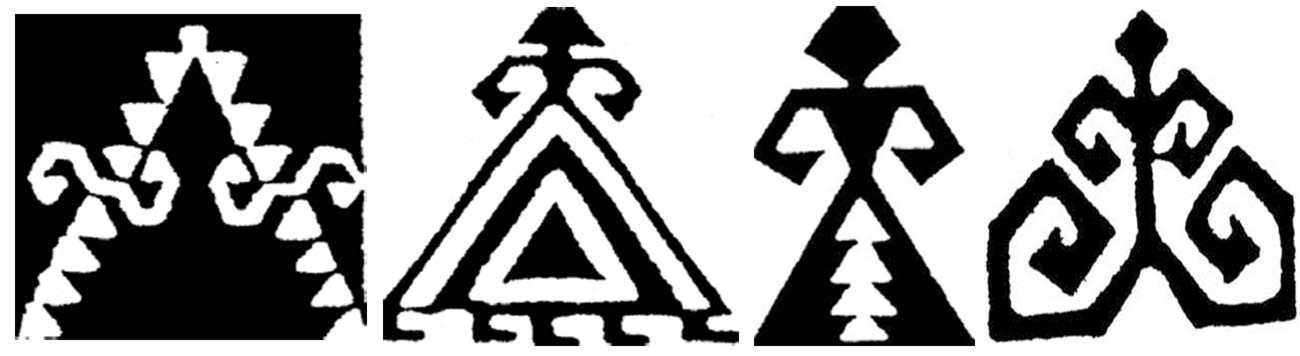
Hands-on-hips female figure (Elibelinde), for motherhood and fertility

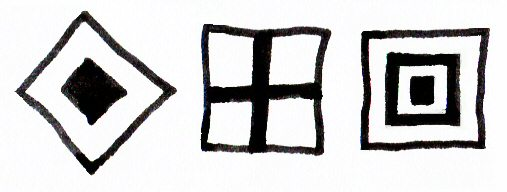
Eye (Göz), to ward off the evil eye

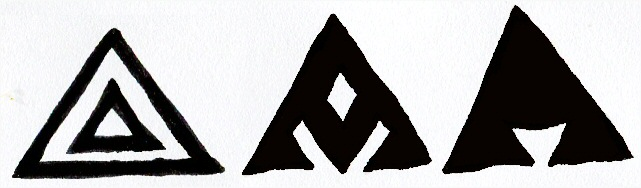
Amulet (Muska), for protection and good luck

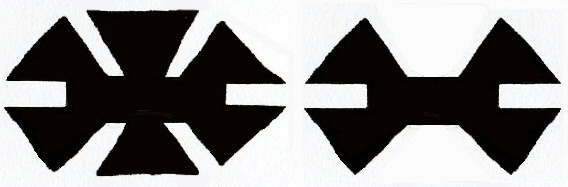
Wolf's Mouth (Kurt Ağzı), to protect the flocks against wolves

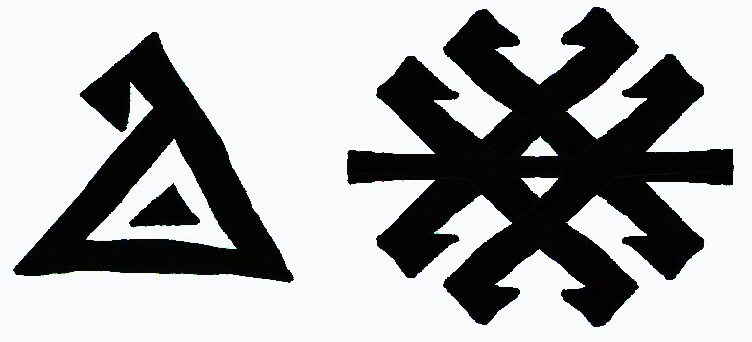
Scorpion (Akrep), for protection from their stings

== Rugs and commerce ==
Because kilims are often cheaper than pile rugs, beginning carpet collectors often start with them. Despite what many perceive as their secondary (or inferior) status to pile carpets, kilims have become increasingly collectible in themselves in recent years, with quality pieces now commanding high prices. What some sensed as inferiority was actually a different nature of rugs woven for indigenous use as opposed to rugs woven on a strictly commercial basis. Because kilims were not a major export commodity, there were no foreign market pressures changing the designs, as happened with pile carpets. Once collectors began to value authentic village weaving, kilims became popular. Three factors then combined to reduce the quality of the West's newly discovered kilims. The first was a development in industrial chemistry. An important element in the attractiveness of traditional rugs is abrash, the dappled appearance resulting from variation in shade of each colour caused by hand-dyeing of the yarn. The synthetic (aniline-derived) dyes introduced late in the Victorian era abolished abrash, giving brilliant colours, which however often faded with time. A second factor was the loss of the nomadic way of life across Central Asia. Once people had settled, the tribal character of their weavings faded. A third factor was a direct consequence of the kilim's new-found marketability. As rugs began to be made for export and money rather than personal use, the local style and social significance of each type of carpet was lost. Patterns and colours were chosen to suit the market, rather than woven according to tradition and to suit the needs of the weaver's family and the weaver's own hopes and fears. (Note: Jon Thompson writes "In terms of carpet weaving we are observers of the very end of an ancient art form.")

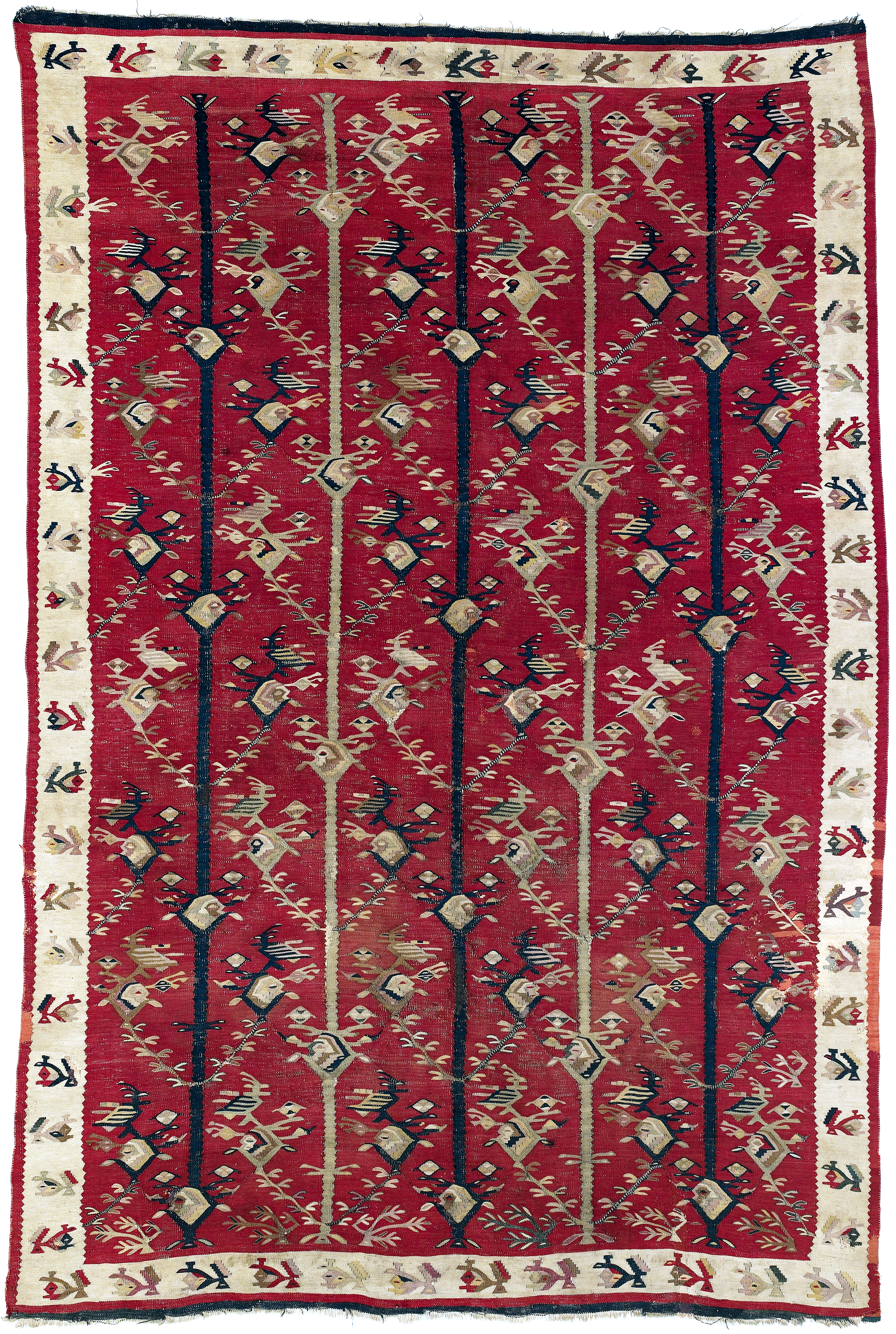
A typical Pirot kilim from Serbia

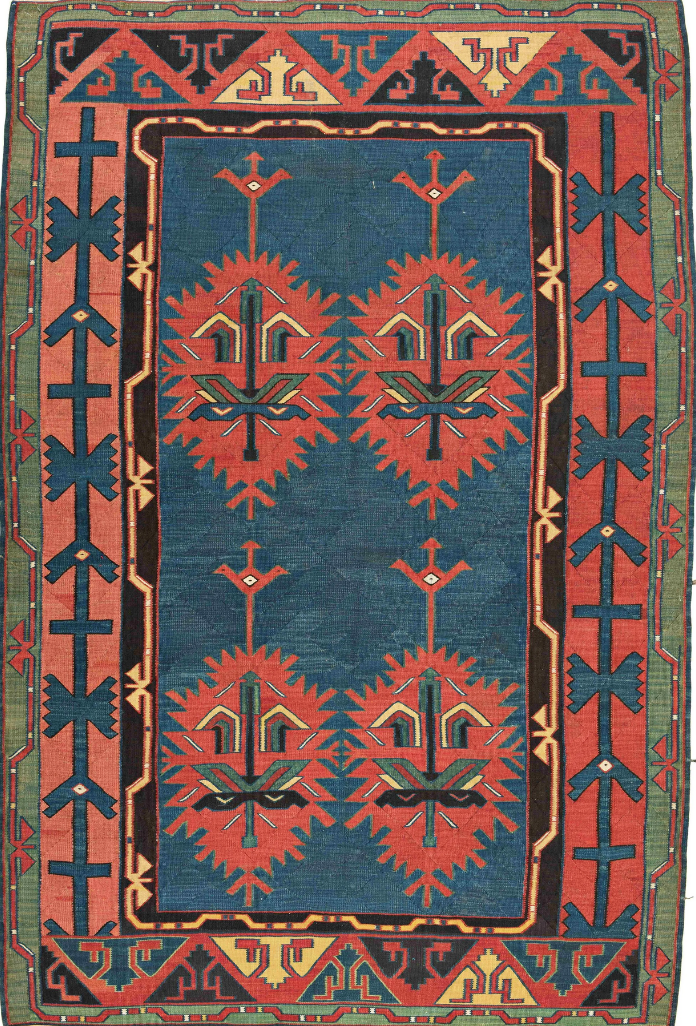
Late 19th century Awar kilim from the Caucasus. An unusually simple and bold design.

=== Anatolian (Turkish) ===
Perhaps the best known and most highly regarded, these kilims are traditionally distinguished by the areas, villages or cities in which they are produced, such as Konya, Malatya, Karapınar and Hotamis. Most Anatolian kilims are slit woven. Larger antique kilims were woven in two to three separate sections on small nomadic horizontal floor looms in three feet wide long strips, then carefully sewn together matching the patterns edges to create an ultimately wider rug. These pieces are still produced in very limited quantities by nomadic tribes for their personal use and are commonly known as cicims.

- Cicim or Jijim or Jajim are kilims woven in narrow strips that are sewn together.
- Zili is a rough supplementary-weft method used to decorate practical objects such as mats, sacks, cushions and tents.

=== Hungarian ===
Hungarian kilims are traditionally made from wool, or with a combination of hemp or linen and wool. They are pileless and knotless, and generally reversible. They feature predominantly geometric patterns and motifs, formed by colour wefts. The earliest attested record of the term kilim in written Hungarian is from 1604, as kilym.

Székely kilims are associated with the Székely Hungarians of Transylvania, with records of their production from the early 17th century. They were traditionally woven with a hemp warp and wool weft.

Commercialised workshop kilim-production flourished in the Torontál county of the historical Kingdom of Hungary during the late 19th century. Alongside ethnic Hungarians, it involved ethnic Serbs, Romanians and Bulgarians in the county. Torontáli kilims were widely popular in the Kingdom of Hungary during the late 19th century into the early 20th century.

== See also ==
- Anatolian rug
- Chiprovtsi kilim – Bulgarian rug
- Jajim – Iranian textile type, similar to a kilim but more like a blanket
- Neiriz Kilim Collection
- Pirot carpet – Rug variety from Pirot, Serbia
- Shahsevan rug
