= Chiprovtsi kilim =

Bulgarian rug

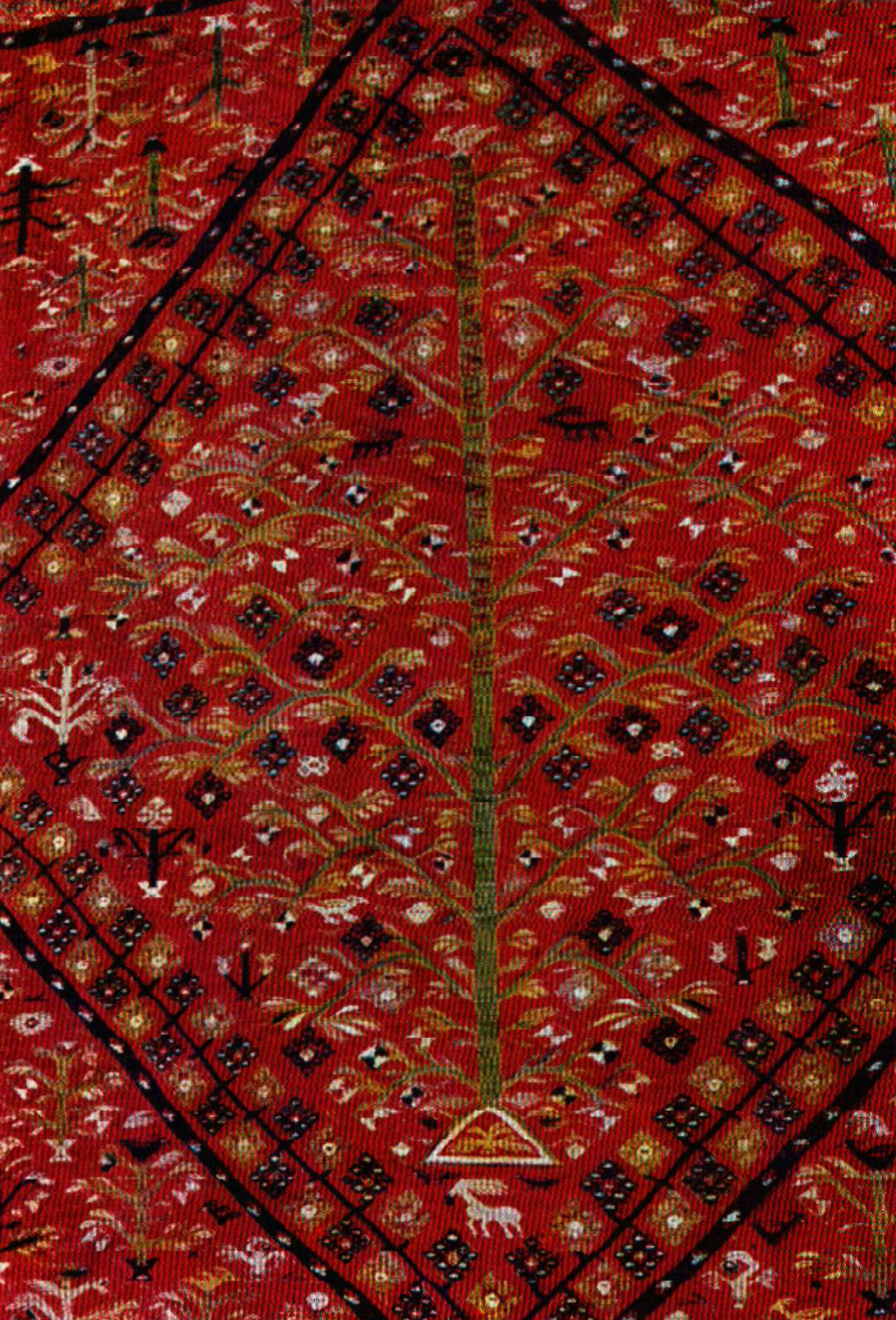
- Chiprovtsi kilim
- Type: Carpeting
- Material: Wool and cotton
- Production method: Weaving
- Production process: Handicraft
- Place of origin: Chiprovtsi, Bulgaria
- Introduced: 17th century

The tradition of carpet-making in Chiprovtsi
- UNESCO Intangible Cultural Heritage
- Country: Bulgaria
- Reference: 00965
- Region: Europe and North America

Inscription history
- Inscription: 2014 (9th session)
- List: Representative

Chiprovtsi kilims (Bulgarian: Чипровски килим, Chiprovski kilim) are handmade flatwoven kilim rugs with two identical sides, part of Bulgarian national heritage, traditions, arts and crafts and pertain to the Western Bulgarian kilim weaving tradition. Their name is derived from the town of Chiprovtsi where their production started in the 17th century.

The basic colours are yellow, brown, red, blue and green. The first carpets were in only two colours - red and black. This unique and typically Bulgarian craft flourished during the Bulgarian National Revival. The carpets are made of natural materials like cotton and wool. Their thickness is 3–5 mm.

The kilim making of Chiprovtsi was inscribed on the Intangible Cultural Heritage list of UNESCO in 2014. While a distinct local tradition, the Chiprovtsi carpets are part of a broader Balkan kilim tradition found across the region and historically centered in the area around the Balkan mountains today located in both Eastern Serbia and Western Bulgaria. The Chiprovtsi carpet is thus associated as a specific type of the historic Pirot carpet.

== History ==
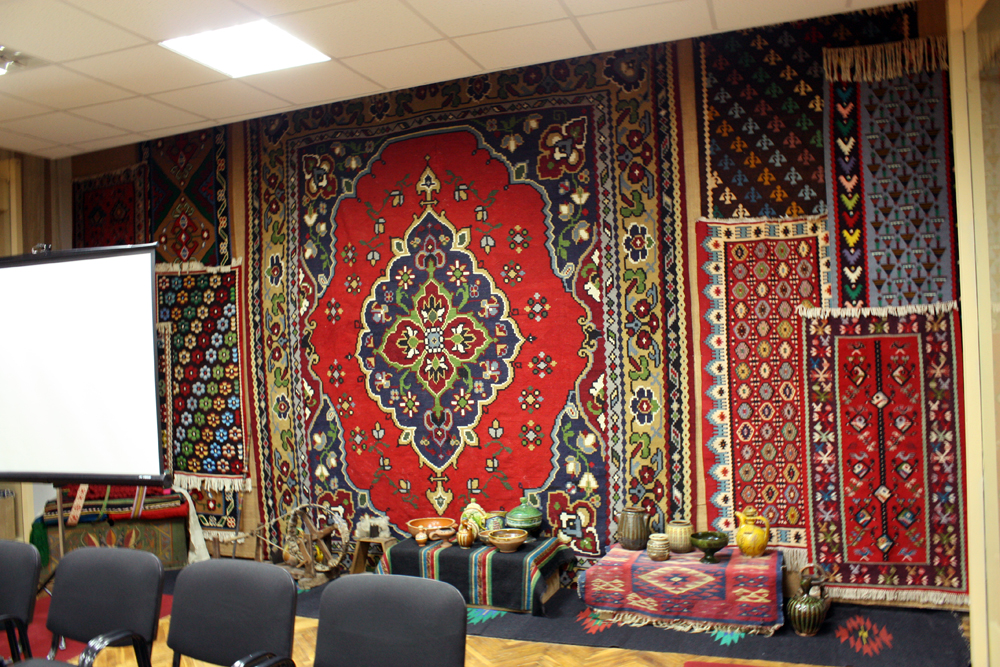
Chiprovtsi carpets collection from Montana, Bulgaria History Museum

The carpet weaving industry played a key role in the revival of Chiprovtsi in the 1720s after the devastation of the failed 1688 Chiprovtsi Uprising against Ottoman rule.

The western traveller Ami Boué, who visited Chiprovtsi in 1836–1838, reported that "mainly young girls, under shelters or in corridors, engage in carpet weaving. They earn only five francs a month and the payment was even lower before". By 1868, the annual production of carpets in Chiprovtsi had surpassed 14,000 square metres.

In 1896, almost 1,400 women from Chiprovtsi and the region were engaged in carpet weaving. In 1920, the locals founded the Manual Labour carpet-weaving cooperative society, the first of its kind in the country.

At present. the carpet (kilim) industry remains dominant in the town. Carpets have been crafted according to traditional designs, but in recent years it is up to the customers to decide the pattern of the carpet they have ordered.

The production of a single 3 by 4 m (9.8 by 13.1 ft) carpet takes about 50 days; primarily women engage in carpet weaving. Work is entirely manual and all used materials are natural; the primary material is wool, coloured using plant or mineral dyes.

The local carpets have been prized at exhibitions in London, Paris, Liège and Brussels. In recent decades, however, the Chiprovtsi carpet industry has been in decline as it had lost its firm foreign markets. As a result, the town and the municipality have been experiencing a demographic crisis.
