= Hamid Sadighi Neiriz =

Iranian artist

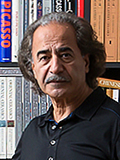
Portrait

Hamid Sadighi Neiriz (born 14 November 1947 in Tehran) is an Iranian visual artist, art dealer, gallerist and art collector. He chose the name Neiriz as artist name after the origin of his family in the Neiriz region of Iran. He has lived in Berlin since 1964.

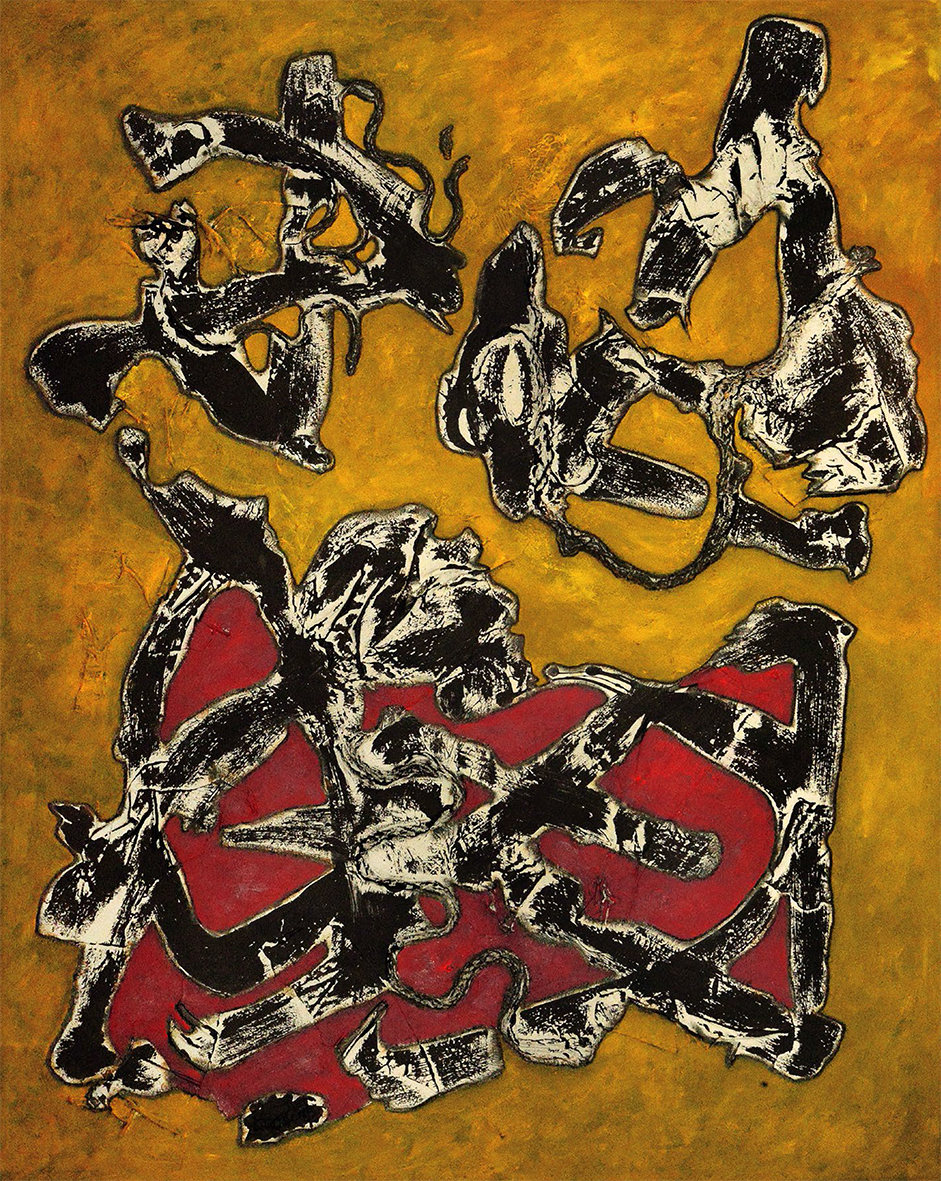
Dance III, 1995

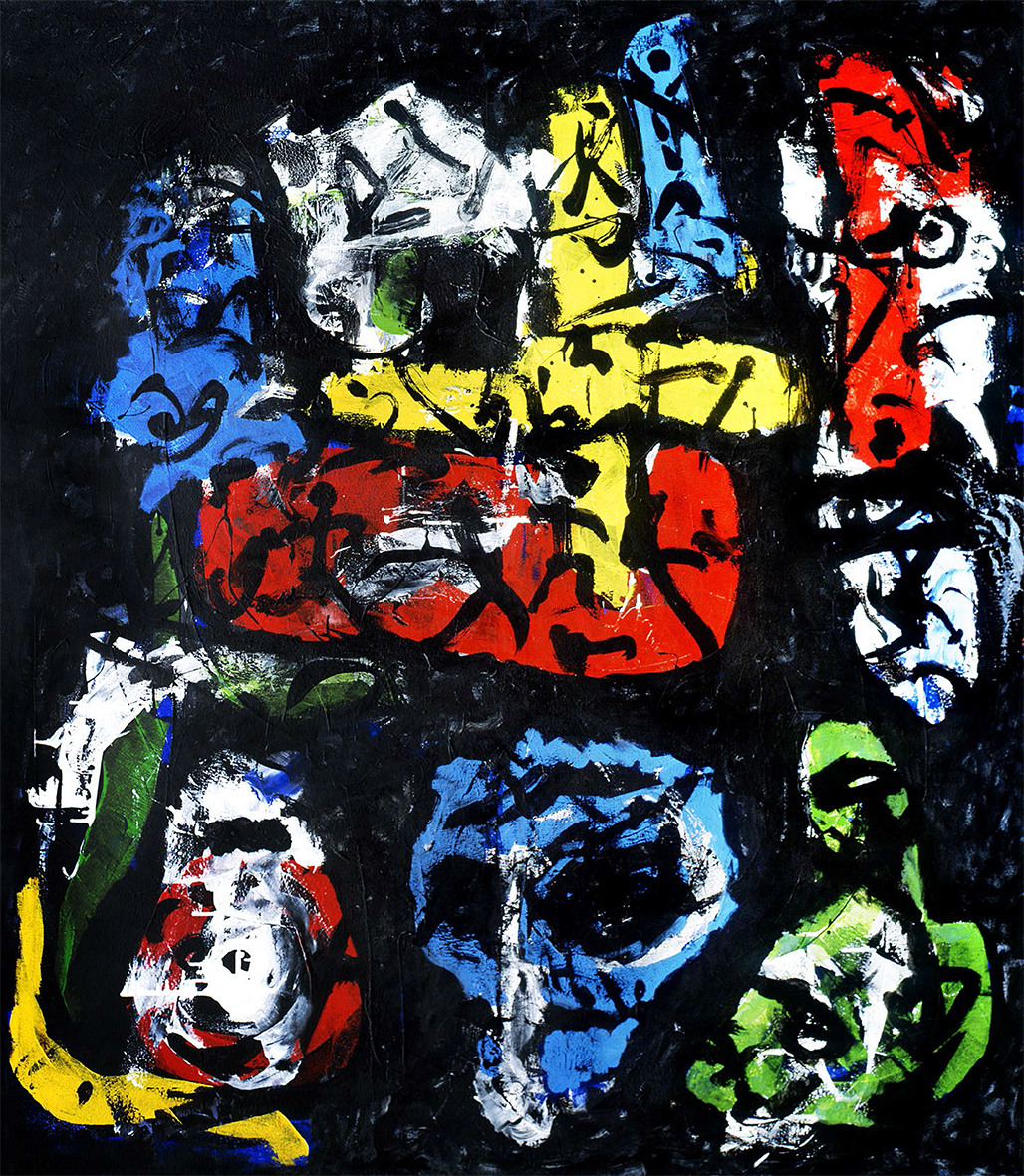
Excavation, 1986

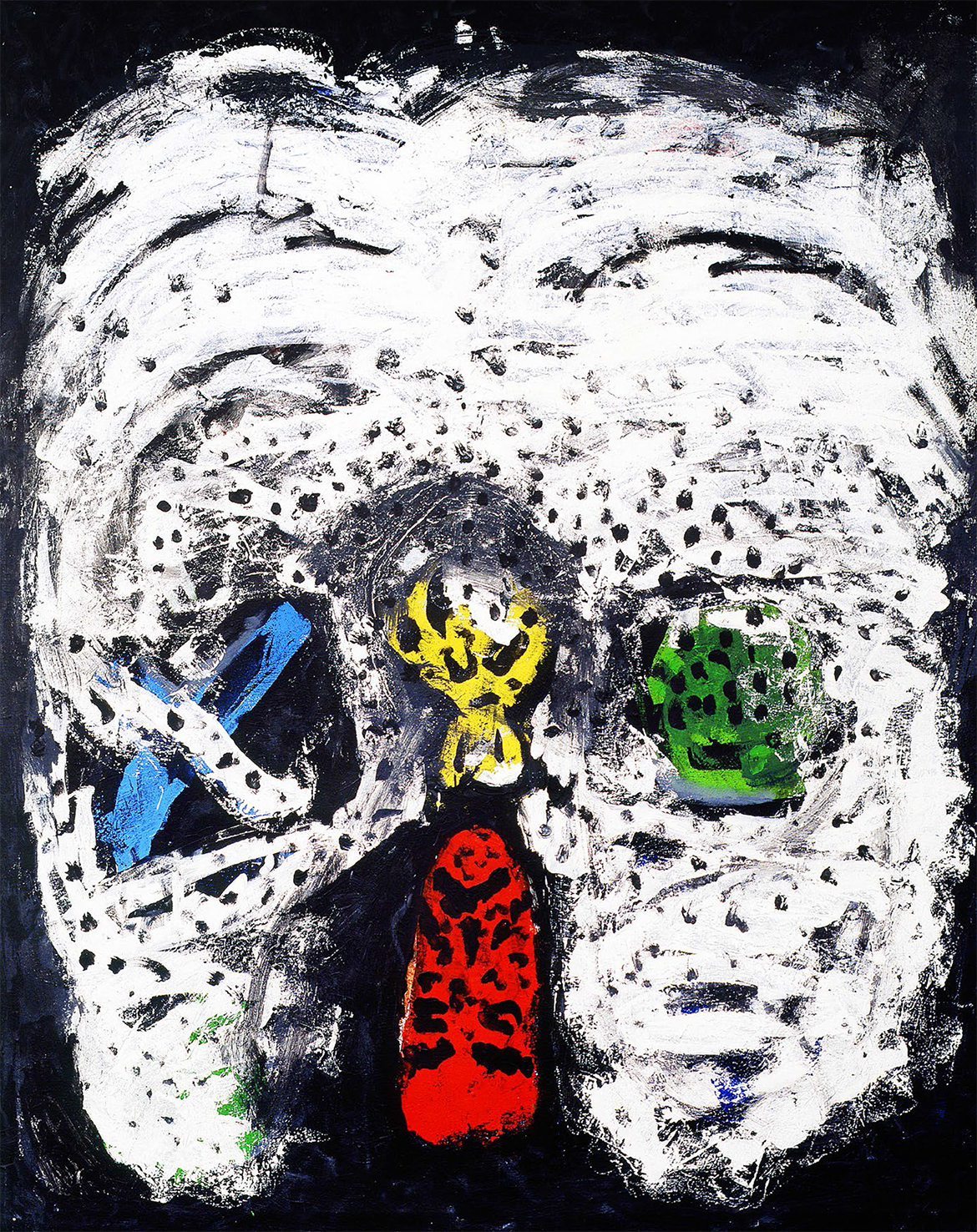
Great Mask, 1988

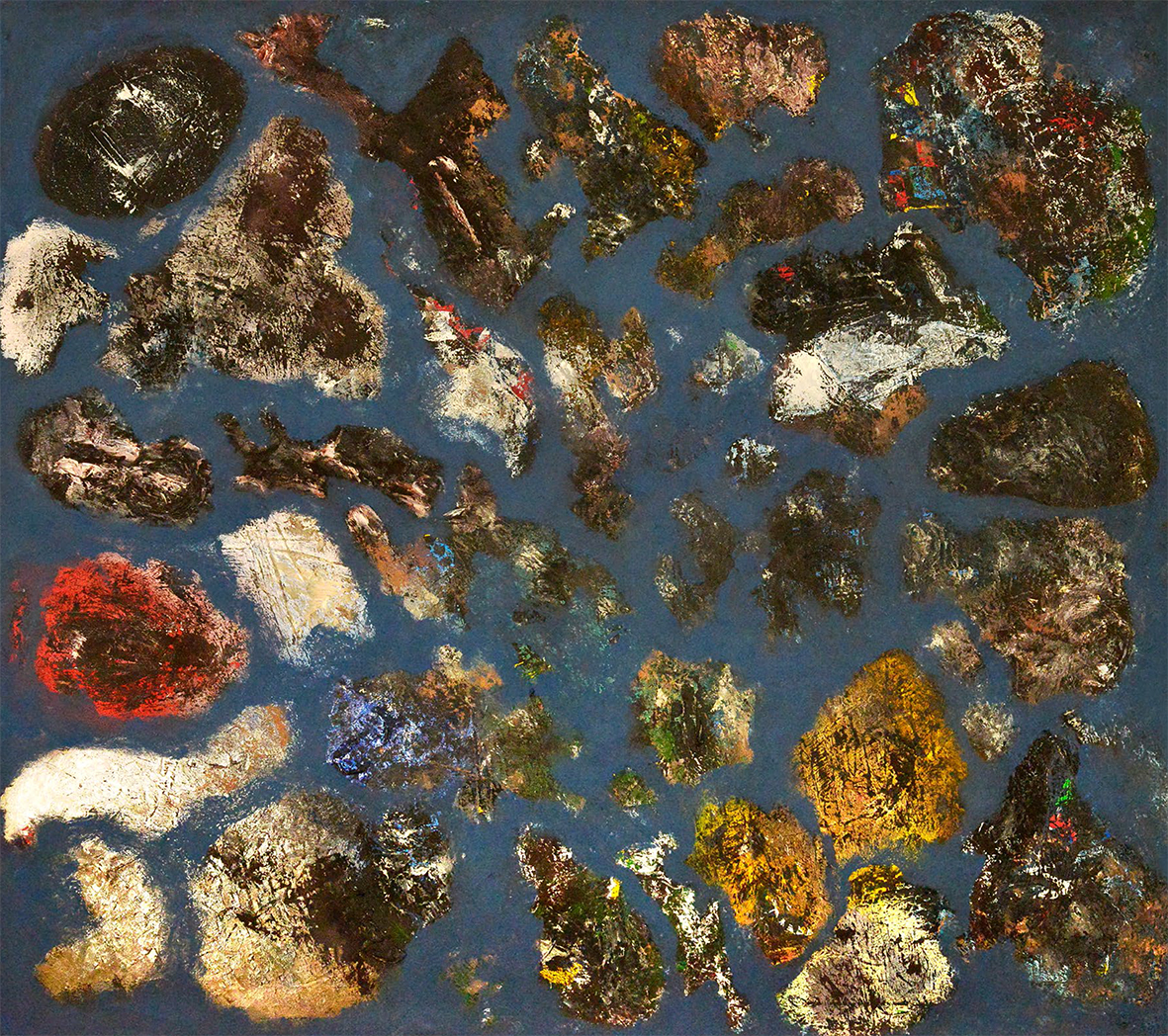
Metamorphosis I, 1997

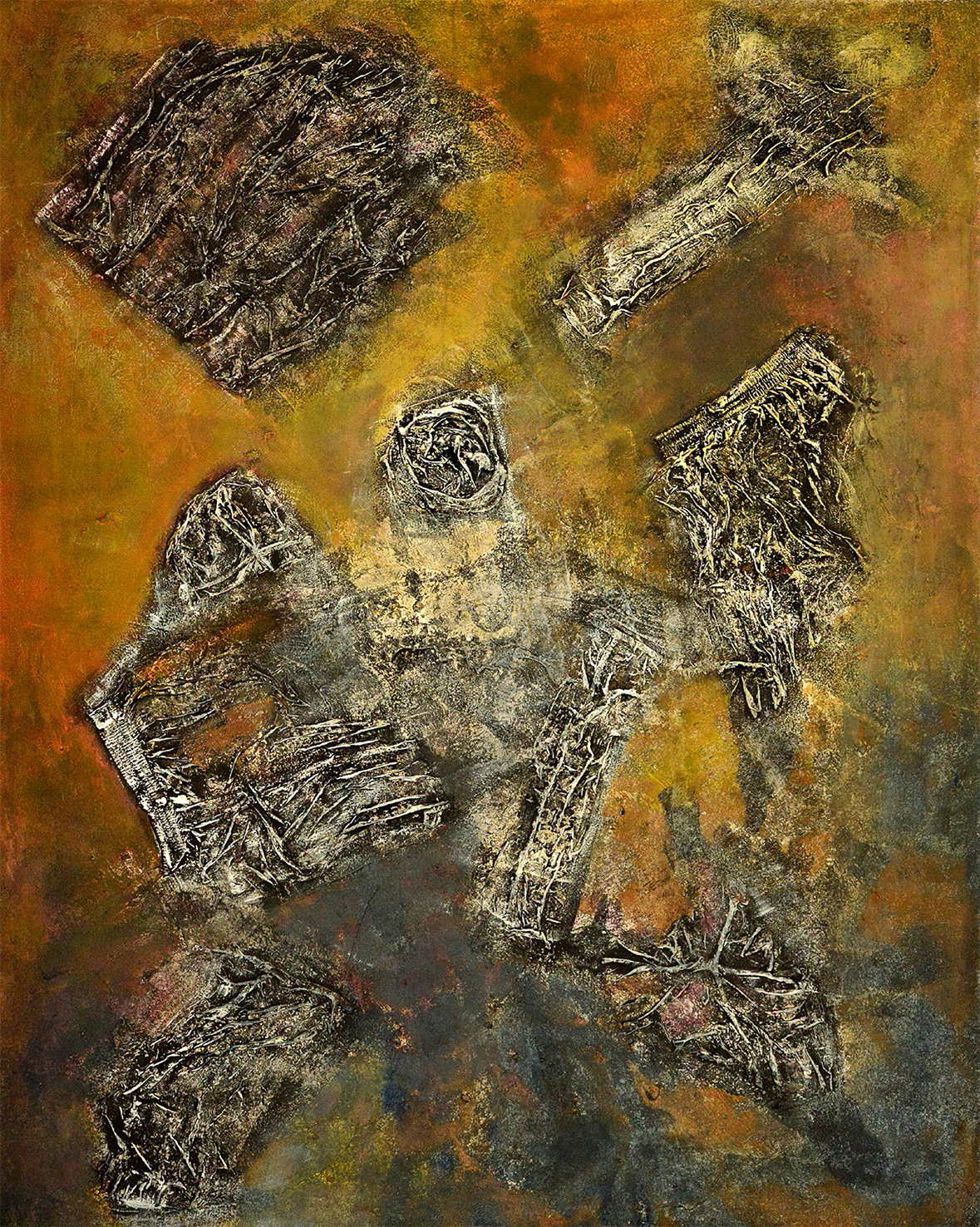
Excavation, 1999

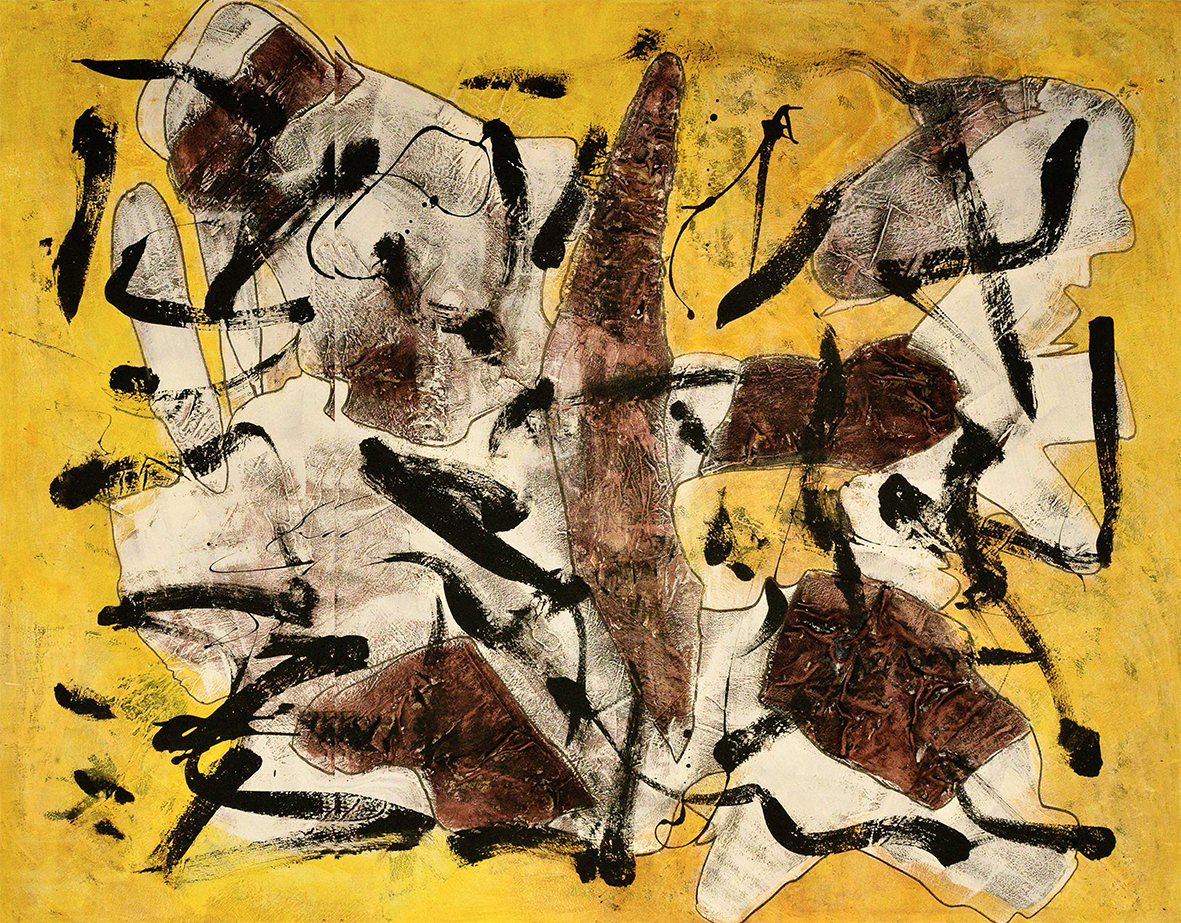
Anahita, 2000-2001

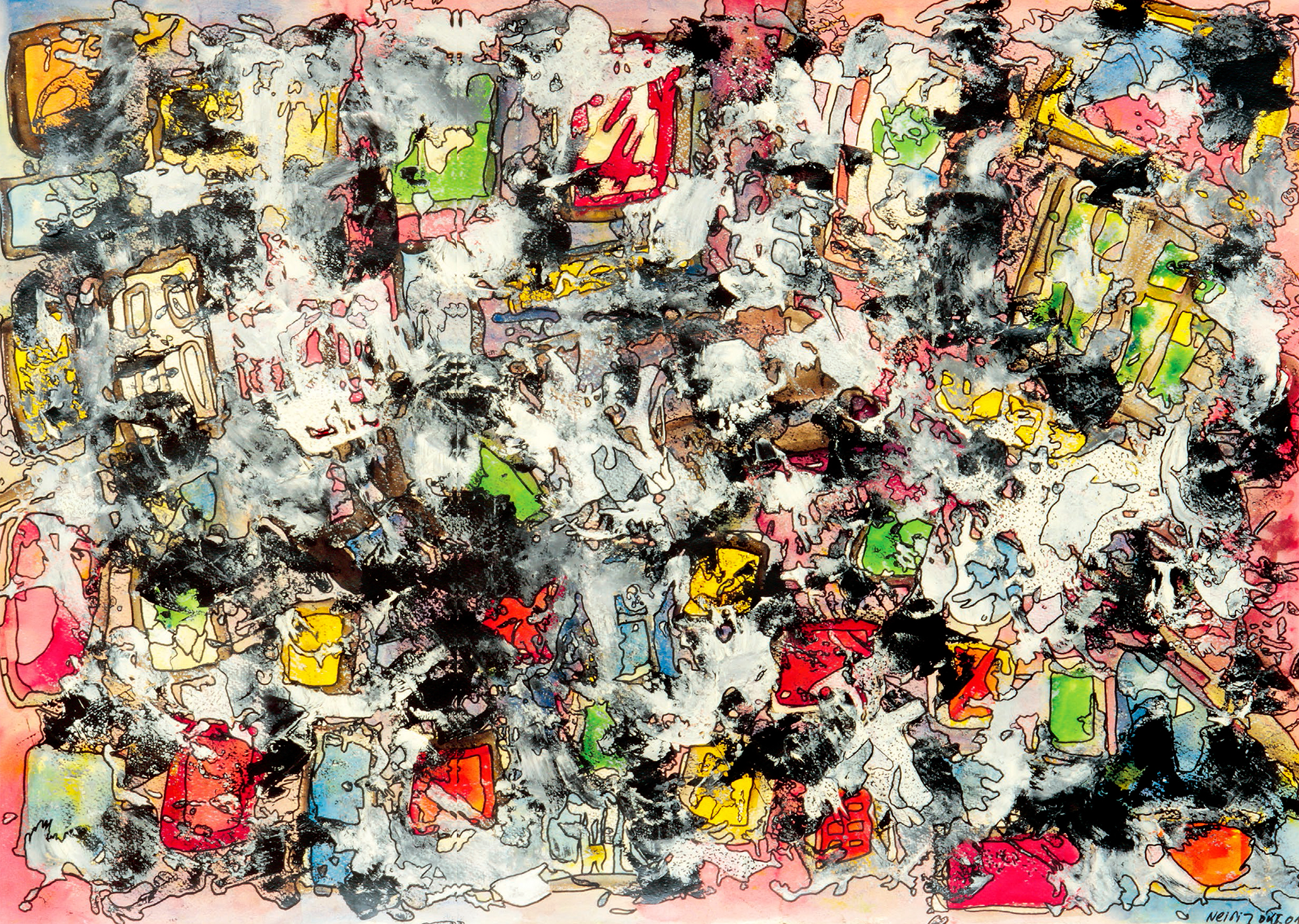
Tornado in the studio, 2000

== Biography ==
Sadighi Neiriz spent his childhood and youth in Tehran. At the age of 17, Neiriz moved to West Berlin, to take up art studies. He began to study in 1966, initially Architecture at the Berlin University of the Arts (UdK), but after a few semesters he switched to Art Photography, which he was practising continuously in the 1970s. From 1972 onward he studied Art History and Archaeology at the Technical University (TU), Art History and Ethnology at the Free University (FU) – in connection with excursions and archaeological excavations. During his studies, Neiriz attended several excavations in the surroundings of the Alban Hills located southeast of Rome. In the course of his studies and in close contact to the Museum of Islamic Art, Neiriz's later orientation towards Islamic Studies was amplified: "After I had experienced a kind of cultural epiphany, I went [1975] to Iran to study archaeology, and to dedicate myself to Persian literature and philosophy". From summer 1976 to winter 1977 Neiriz attended the lectures of Professor Seyyed Hossein Nasr on philosophy of Suhrawardi at the University of Tehran, and of Professor Abdolhossein Zarrinkoob on the Masnavi of Rumi. During that period his main studies were Archaeology with Professor Ezzatollah Negahban, followed by various excavation expeditions in 1977 under Negahban's direction in the east of Sefid Rud. After a year, Neiriz returned to Berlin, but soon went back to Esfahan, to do research for his doctoral thesis at the Madrasah Chahar Bagh under the supervision of Professor Honarfar. During a break in one of the traditional tea rooms he discovered an antique nomadic kilim, which brought up associations with compositions of classical modern paintings, and he set out to search for similar pieces. Neiriz started a collection, explored origins, travelled to the nomads and their khans.

== Painting ==
In his early paintings (1972-1979) could be mainly figurative-surrealistic tendencies. With time, it moved to a more abstract gestural painting techniques in proximity to Informal Art, Tachism or Abstract Expressionism – tendencies formed immediately after World War II, which continue until today. They are regarded as a further development of Abstract Art, originating in the 19th century, but are perceived as autonomous movements only at the beginning of Modernism in the 20th century.

Neiriz's study of the world art, mostly in direct contact with originals, his own Iranian background, his knowledge of history and religion, and his domicile in the west-east oriented cultural metropolis of Berlin flow into his work. Three groups determine Neiriz's 2001/2002 exhibition at the Spandau Citadel, differentiated by his series Excavations, Fragments and Masks, which stand for the archaic ethno-religious elements of his art. The reappearing title "Mask" underlines the importance of the mask for Neiriz, especially those of African Tribal Art. With his work cycles Neiriz takes up the sensual and spiritual experiences in dealing with ancient art and translates them into his own artistic forms of expression.

== Photography ==
Photography played a significant role in Neiriz's early years and was followed by several exhibitions: e.g. at the Goethe-Institut in Tehran in December 1978 during the Iranian Revolution which showcased his social critical photographs taken in Iran before the revolution, one in 1979 at the Deutsch-Französische Gesellschaft in Berlin, titled Tableaux Parisiens which presented his street and architectural photographs taken in Paris. The Tehran exhibition included colored as well as black and white photographs.

Neiriz's photography exhibitions in Tehran were well attended and soon he was hailed as “the mystic Hamid is a thoughtful artist of the Revolution. Dr. Javad Mojabi describes Neiriz as a "thinking artist, equipped with an aesthetic eye and intellectual approach to photography. He encourages his audience to explore behind the decorative veneer of his themes, uncovering deeper, innate aspects of objects as metaphors, so that content or conflict becomes visible. His photographs show a wealth of symbolism, often connected to religion and mysticism".

== Neiriz Kilim Collection ==
Kilims became the main emphasis of Berlin based “Gallery Neiriz”, which was established together with Karin Pregley Hawkes und Robin Hawkes in Berlin on April 1, 1980, with Neiriz's discoveries from his travels. Soon it advanced to one of the leading galleries of Non-European Art. Although ancient nomadic weaving of the Near East remained the focus, over time African and Oceanic Tribal Art, Islamic and Buddhist Art, archaeological objects from China, Persia, and ancient America, Japanese woodblock prints and Chinese furniture were added. Neiriz's knowledge of kilims is not only based on ethnological studies. The experience that he gained during many travels plays an equally important role. In accompanying nomadic tribes on their migration from winter to summer quarters, he experienced their understanding of nature and the cosmos. In the 1998/99 weavings from the Neiriz Collection were shown in the exhibition “Das Bauhaus webt” (“Bauhaus Weaves”). Here, for the first time nomadic weaves were seen in direct comparison with Bauhaus products. An important inspirer of Bauhaus weaving, Paul Klee (1879–1940), was also interested in nomadic art and whose "feeling was subject to similar primal fears".
