= Arak rug =

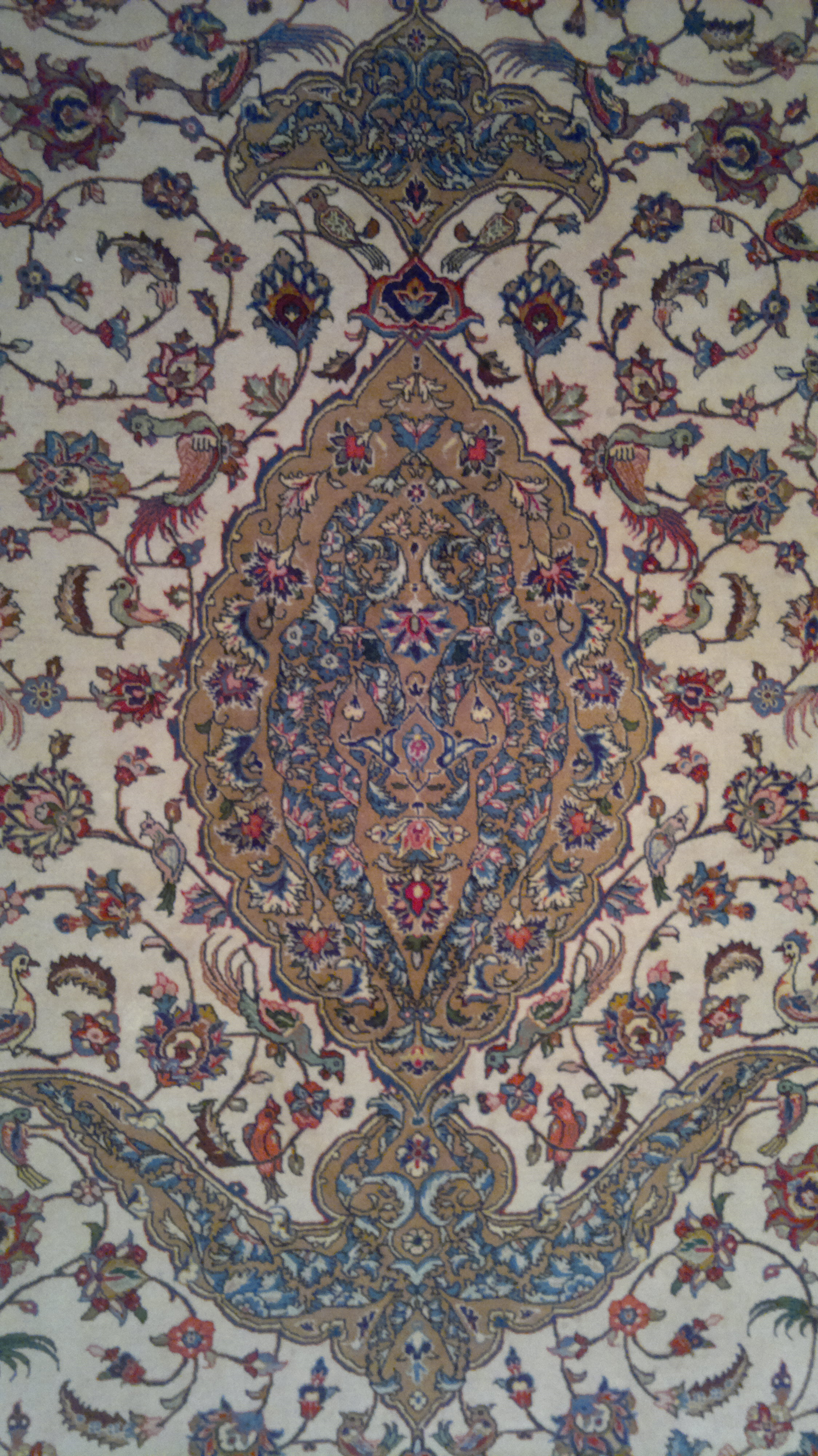
Arak carpet design by Isa Bahadori

Arak rugs, otherwise known as Arak carpets, are made in the province of Arak, Iran. Technically, all rugs from Arak can be considered Arak rugs but those termed Sarouk are marked as of the best quality, while the more general term Arak is used for rugs of lesser quality. Meshkabad used to be the term for the worst quality rugs, but such rugs are now called mahal or Arak. Araks are much more coarsely knotted than the rugs of than Sarouk rugs. Their designs are quite similar, although rather more crudely executed, and often display bold floral medallions set against open fields.
