= Azadeh Bokaie Dadgar =

Iranian lawyer, journalist and editor (born 1980)

- Born: August 6, 1980 (age 45); Arak, Iran
- Occupations: Lawyer; Journalist; Editor; Women's rights activist
- Years active: 1999–present

Azadeh Bokaie Dadgar (Persian: آزاده بُکایی دادگر, born August 6, 1980) is an Iranian lawyer, journalist, editor, and women's rights activist.

== Life ==
Azadeh Bokaie Dadgar was born on 6 August 1980 in Arak, Iran. From an early age, she became involved in political activism, taking part in protests and advocating for democratic reforms and human rights. At the age of 19, she began her journalism career as a writer for the Laleh Sorkh newspaper in Arak. She later became the editor of the Atreyas newspaper.

In 2017, Dadgar was arrested following the Iranian presidential elections, an action that drew criticism from Radio Deutschland and the Human Rights Organization of Iran. During January 2018 protests, she was detained a second time, this time at her mother’s home. Later that same year, she was arrested once more by the Markazi Intelligence Organization. In total, Dadgar has been arrested at least three times by Iranian authorities in connection with her activism and journalistic work.
