= Sarouk carpet =

Type of Persian rug

A Sarouk rug is a type of Persian rug from Markazi province in Iran. Sarouk (also Saruk or Sarough) rugs are those woven in the village of Saruk and also the city of Arak and the surrounding countryside.

== Rug market ==
Sarouk rugs have been produced for much of the twentieth century. The early successes of the Sarouk rug are largely owed to the American market. From the 1910s to 1950s, the "American Sarouk", also known as the "painted Sarouk", was produced.

American customers had an affinity for the Sarouk's curvilinear and floral designs. What they did not appreciate, however, was the color, so for much of the 1920s, 1930s and 1940s, rugs exported from Iran were dyed to a desirable, deep, raspberry-red color, once they arrive in the USA. In the second half of the 19th century, a huge market was created for Persian carpets in Europe and in the US. Many merchants bought the old and antique Persian rugs from all over Iran and exported them to other countries. They used the city of Tabriz in northwest Iran to export these antiques to Europe via Erzurum in Turkey. Some merchants also used the southern ports on the Persian Gulf to export Persian rugs to the US by ship.

== Workshops ==
By the later decades of the 19th century, probably around 1880, the supply of these fine antique rugs from Persia was on the low side. Therefore, many of the merchants from Tabriz decided to establish workshops in Sultanabad to produce rugs for the western market. This region had a fine carpet weaving tradition and was a perfect place to set up looms and rug workshops. Sarouk is a village located 30 miles north of the city of Sultanabad (today called Arak). Sarouk is famous for weaving very heavy body carpets.

== Rising demand ==
To meet the rising demand in the west for Persian rugs, the British-Switzerland company Ziegler & Co. opened its office in Tabriz in 1878 and in Sultanabad in 1883. The first World Oriental Carpet Exhibition in 1891 in Vienna and another one in London in 1892 created a rising demand for Persian rugs in the west. Companies such as the British-Italian Nearco Castelli Brothers and the Eastern Rug Trading Company of New York established their branches in 1909 in Tabriz and later in Kerman. Atiyeh Brothers of Oregon also established their weaving facilities in Kerman after the start of the 20th century.

== Sarouk style ==
Of these cities, Sultanabad and the surrounding towns and villages such as Sarouk, Farahan and Lilihan were the most famous in the US. After establishing the offices and branches of foreign companies, the designs were created based on the customers' tastes and demands, and new types of Persian rugs were produced. The kind of rugs today called Ziegler, or Sultanabad, were produced from the early years of the 20th century with the designs and color combination that Americans liked. There are many of them which are called the American Sarouk. Their colors look kind of dark or dirty pink. They have overall designs with no medallion or a very small floral medallion.

Sarouk rugs continue to be produced today, using the same methods as during early production, with the exception of the post-production dye job. Known for their exceptional quality and ability to withstand decades of wear, Sarouks continue to be best sellers. They are made with a high quality, tough wool using a Persian knot. A tell tale sign of a Sarouk is usually its blue weft threads, salmon or tomato-red color mixed with ivory and blues, and a very traditional, floral style. The finest of the modern Sarouk rugs come from the small town of Ghiassabad.
