= AJK =

AJK may refer to:

- Azad Jammu and Kashmir, or Azad Kashmir, part of Kashmir administered by Pakistan
- AJK TV, or PTV Azad Jammu and Kashmir, an Urdu-language Pakistan Television Corporation channel for Azad Kashmir
- A.J.K. Mass Communication Research Centre, a research centre in New Delhi
- Arak Airport, Iran (by IATA airport code)
