= Machine Sazi Arak =

Company in Iran

Machine Sazi Arak (MSA)

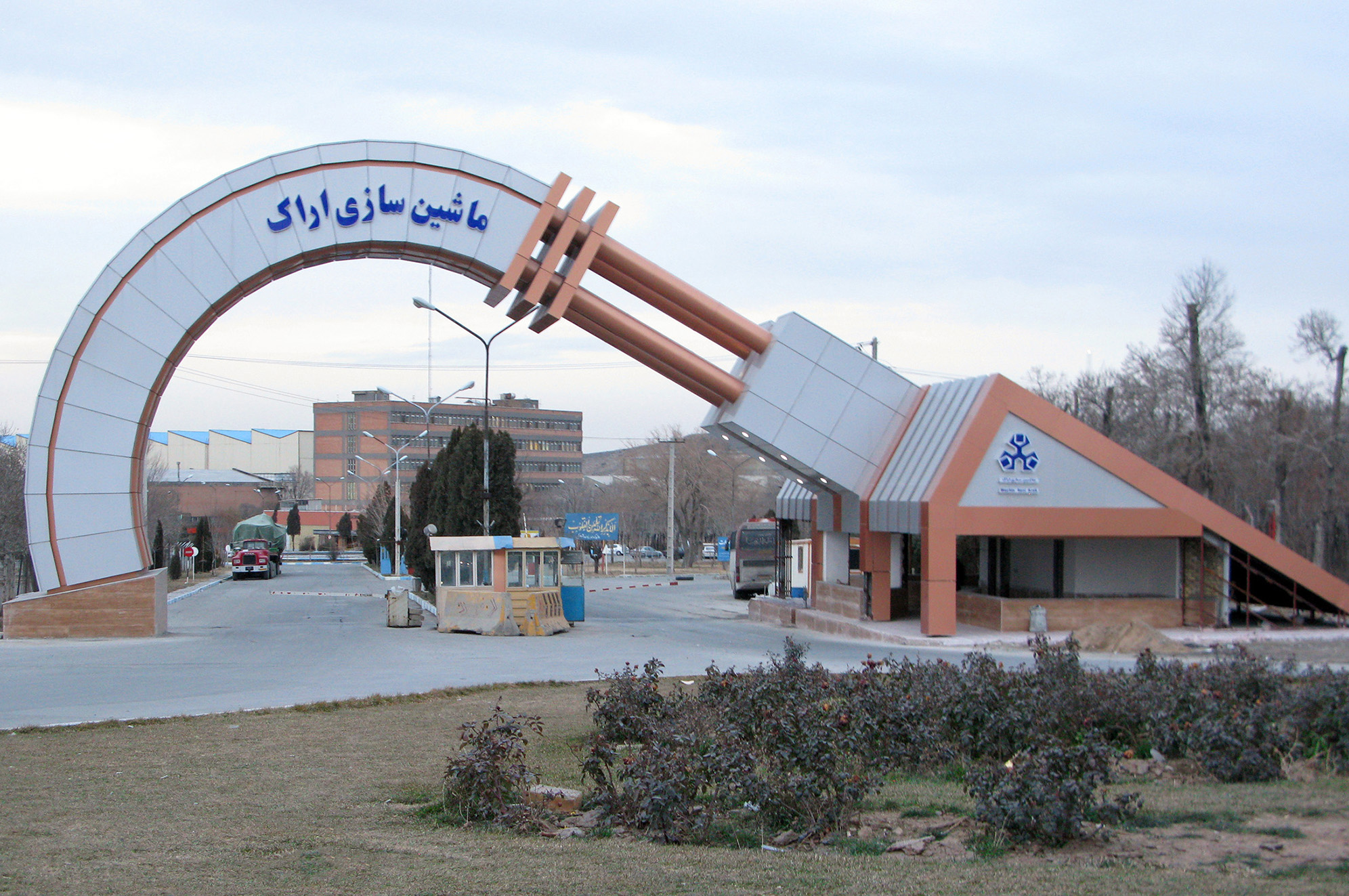
- Company type: Public
- Industry: Construction; Energy Industry; Machinery; Oil Industry
- Founded: 1967
- Headquarters: Arak, Iran
- Area served: Worldwide
- Products: Air coolers; Boilers; Bridges; Centrifugal pumps; Container cranes; Draw works; Drilling rigs; Fractionating columns; Gantry cranes; Heat exchangers; Heavy steel structures; Hydraulic pumps; Incinerators; Industrial furnaces; Mud motors; Overhead cranes; Pressure vessels; Process equipment; Reactors; Ship unloaders; Storage tanks, including Spherical tanks; Steel buildings; Turbines; Valves; Wheelset; Wellhead equipment
- Services: Gas plant building; Oil refinery building; Petrochemical plant building; Steel mill building; Steel bridge building
- Revenue: ▲US$ 0,6 billion (2011)
- Website: www.msa.ir

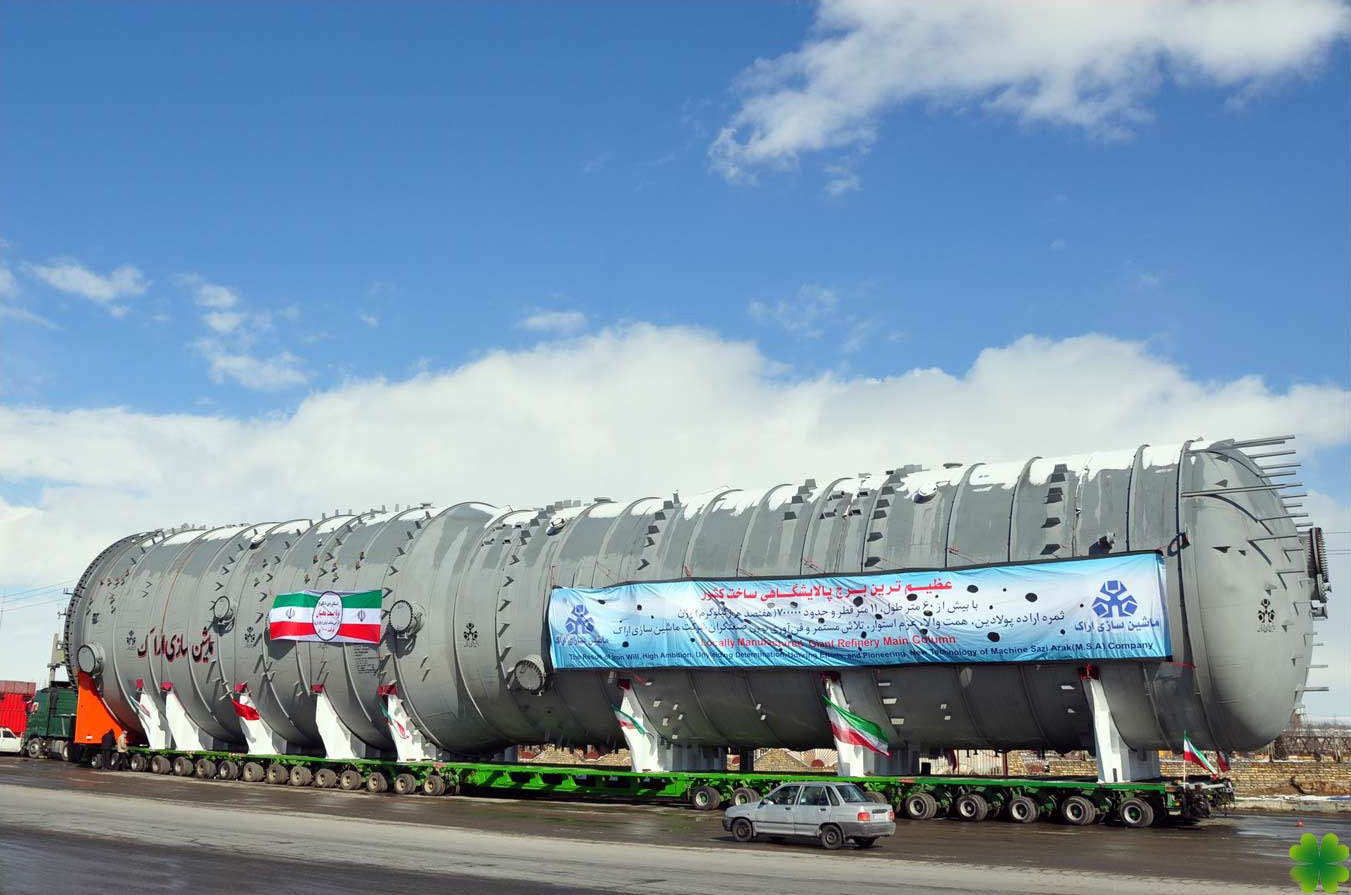
Giant Fractionating column manufactured by Machine Sazi Arak (MSA)

Machine Sazi Arak (MSA) is an Iranian industrial machinery and equipment manufacturing corporation that was established in 1967 in an area of 134 hectares in the city of Arak in order to support underlying industries and meet the industrial needs of the country.

== Activities and products ==
Some of the activities and products of MSA are as follows: Engineering, procurement, construction, development, installation of oil, gas, petrochemical, chemical factories, automotive and metal industries and power plant equipment including storage tanks, mobile and fixed pressure vessels, fractionating columns, industrial furnaces, heat exchangers, air coolers, spherical tanks, indirect heat exchangers, mobile oil treating (MOT) units, gate valves and well-head equipment, drilling rigs, process pumps for oil and gas industry, cranes, hydro mechanical equipment for dams, fire tube and water tube boilers as well as combination cycles boilers, bridges and heavy steel structures, production of alloy steels, pressure flanges, industrial rings, axle and railways tires, steel balls, heavy machining industrial furnaces as well as manufacturing machines and plant equipment and industrial incinerators.

== Groups ==
- Equipment Manufacturing Group
- Metallurgy Manufacturing Group
- Boiler Manufacturing Group
- Bridges and Steel Structure Manufacturing Group
- Machining and Assembly Group
