= Arak University of Medical Sciences =

Iranian medical school in Arak, Iran

Coordinates: 34.0800°N 49.7000°E

- Type: Public university
- Established: 1987
- Location: Arak, Markazi Province, Iran
- Website: www.arakmu.ac.ir/en

Arak University of Medical Sciences is an Iranian medical school located in Arak, Iran. This university is the main health care provider in Markazi province. After getting the required permissions for the founding of Arak School of Medicine in 1987, in February 1988 School of Medical Sciences commenced its activities.

In 1990, The university was converted to "University of Medical Sciences".

In 1994 with the inclusion of regional organizations for Health in the University of Medical Sciences, this university was named the University of Medical Sciences and Health Services, Markazi Province, and it took responsibility for offering health services in province.

== Arak School of Medicine ==
The school began its activities with the goal of education and training for society's required physicians in 1986. The school of medicine, containing many hospitals which affiliated with Arak University of Medical Sciences, including:

== Valie Asr Hospital ==
Valie Asr Hospital is the main hospital in the Markazi province. This center was founded in 1950 and is one of the major medical centers that is affiliated with the University of Medical Sciences in Markazi province, with 280 beds and 320 beds that are allocated to patients in emergency service. Also, it is active in the field of education and training in the fields of medicine, nursing, resident expert, etc.

== Amir-al-Momenin Education and Treatment Center ==
This center serves as one of the specialties and subspecialties in Iran. Overall, the hospital consists of three blocks: administrative, treatment, and clinic blocks.

== Amirkabir Education and Treatment Center ==
This center, as the oldest hospital in Arak, founded in 1939, in 5 specialties: ENT, pediatrics, cardiovascular, psychiatry, with 220 approved beds and 247 active beds as an educational and treatment center affiliated to Arak University of Medical Sciences, is serving to patients. Also interns in pediatrics, internal ward, Anesthesia, are carrying out activities in this center. This hospital is equipped with the only MRI facility supported by government finances accepts other neighborhoods provinces.

Taleghani Education and Treatment Center This center is located in west district of Arak city and at the beginning, it was founded with the name of Health & Treatment Center and after some years changed its name to Taleghani Maternity hospital in 1967, and at this moment it undertakes its missions as Taleghani Education and Treatment Center with 98 beds.

== Ayatollah-Khansari Education and Treatment Center ==
The hospital building was completed under the supervision of Imam of Arak's Friday Congregational Prayers at that time, Ayatollah Khansari, and with benevolent help in 1986; and construction project finished in 1996; and after, for a while has activity as clinical, the outpatient ward and charitable and then it was closed for a few years. The hospital was delivered to Arak University of Medical Sciences in 2006. Imam Reza (A.S) specialized and subspecialized polyclinic The polyclinic has officially started its activity since 2008. Now this polyclinic includes 23 active clinics and 5 para-clinics (laboratory, radiology, Audiometry, council and injections). Doing genetic tests at the province is other services that is offered in this polyclinic; and it has signed contracts with all major insurance companies. Kosar specialized and sub specialized polyclinic The polyclinic has officially started its activity since 2011. The polyclinic building consists of four floors, 14 clinics and 7 para-clinics. Clinic services including internal medicine, pediatrics, obstetrics, ophthalmology, ENT, orthopedics, dermatology, cardiology, general surgery, infectious diseases, neonatal, nephrology, neurology and physical medicine. Para- clinic including laboratory, pathology, cytology, ultrasound, hearing assessment, nutrition, thyroid assessment.

== Arak School of Nursing and Midwifery ==
This school established in 1986 and absorbed students of Midwifery associate degree and Nursing B.S degree, also of Operating Room,

== Arak School of Health ==
School of Health established in 2010, with separation Fight against Diseases-Health, Family Health, Environmental Health and Occupational Health associate degrees from School of par medicine, base on sanction of the Cabinet at provincial trip in 2008, and began its activities independently; and Fight against Diseases-Health and Family Health majors of associate degrees became Public Health continuous BA degree, since second semester of the academic year 2010–2011. History of health majors at Arak University of Medical Sciences goes back to 1998, with Fight against Diseases-Health and Family Health associate degrees. Added public health non-continuous and Occupational Health continuous BA degree in semester 2009–10, and Health Education MA degree since first semester 2011 to other majors of the school.

== Arak School of Dentistry ==
Established in 2012 and has begun its activity by admitting 26 students which half of them are native students of Markazi province. Clinical Academic Groups: Oral and Maxillofacial diseases, Endodontics, Restorative and Aesthetic Dentistry, Orthodontics, Oral and Maxillofacial Radiology, Oral and Maxillofacial Surgery, Prosthetics, Periodontics, Pediatric Dentistry and Oral Pathology.

== Arak School of Rehabilitation ==
Arak University of Medical Sciences for training young and efficient manpower with the aim of providing services and improving individuals who suffering from mental disorders or physical illness have launched school of Rehabilitation in the Markazi province. Educational groups: Occupational Therapy major: Audiology major: Audiology major in the world dating back to World War II . Speech Therapy major: Speech therapy is one of the majors of medical sciences which lead to a bachelor's degree. During this program students are familiar with speech and language and its role and importance in personal and social skills and learn communication development and its factors influencing.
