= Four Seasons Bathhouse =

Historic bathhouse in Arak, Iran

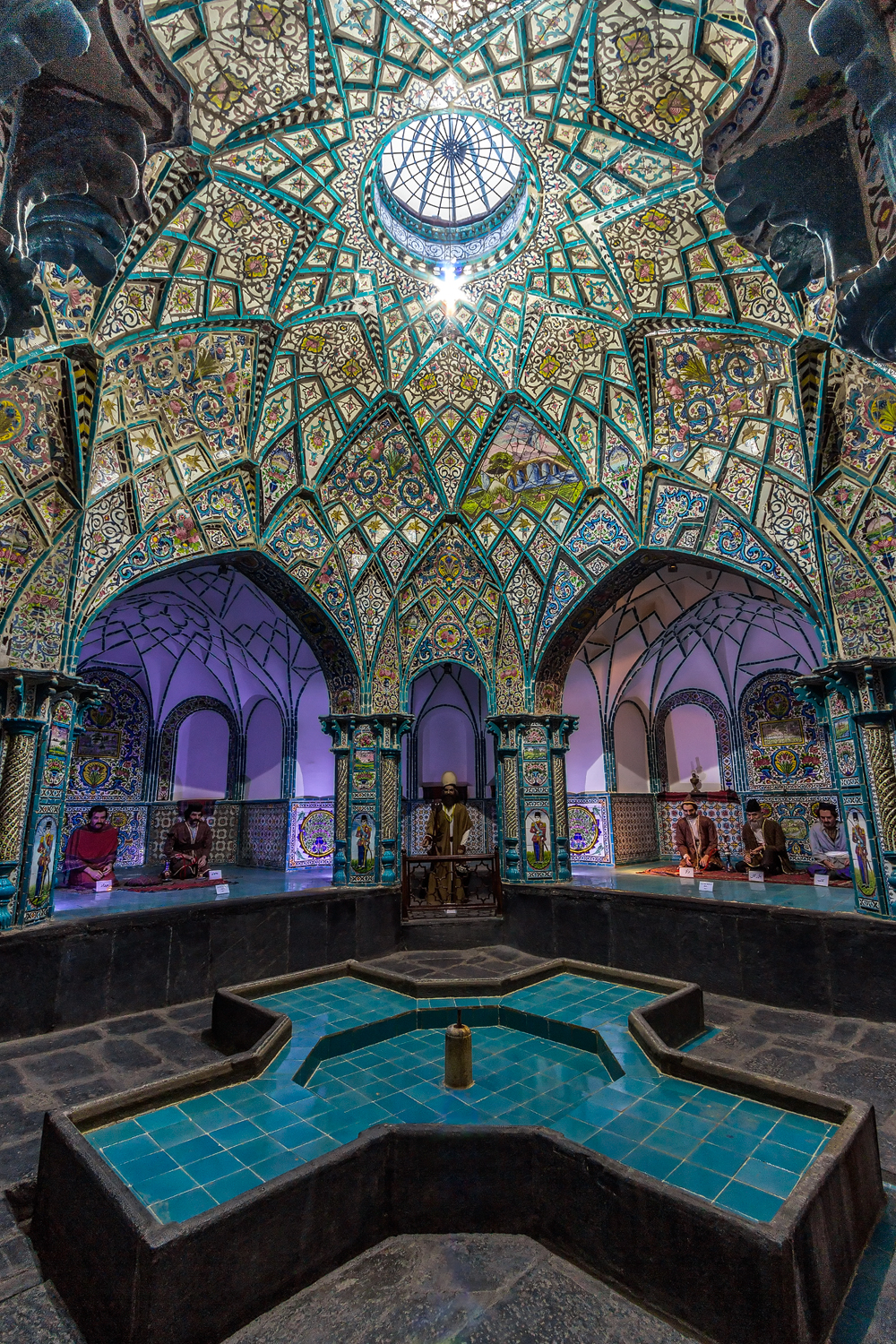
- Interactive map of Four Seasons Bathhouse
- Location: Arak, Iran

History
- Built: Qajar era

Site notes
- Architect: Haji Mohammad Ibrahim Khansari

The Four-Season Bathhouse (Persian: حمام چهارفصل) in the Iranian city Arak dates back to the late Qajar era, and had two separate sections for ladies and gents. The tile-work of the clock room and spinal designed columns of this area, including the layout of the bath are interesting features. The structure was renovated into a museum after undergoing necessary repairs.

== Overview ==
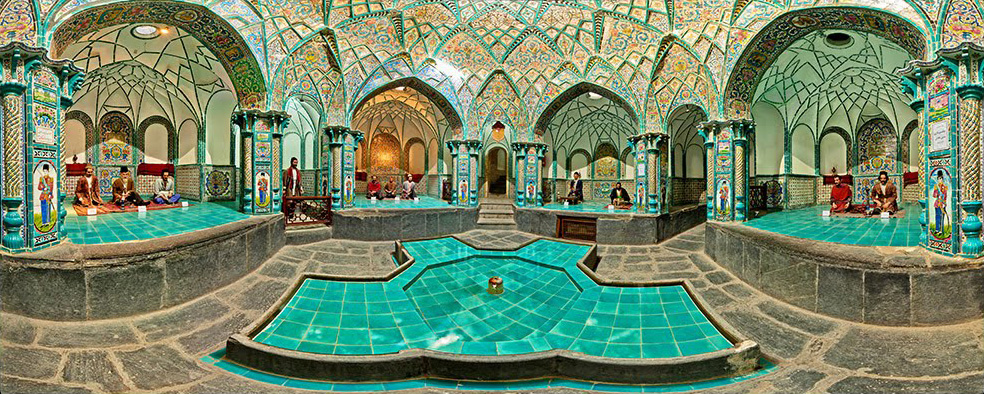
Panorama of Four Seasons Bathroom

The Four Seasons Bathhouse in Arak was the largest bathhouse in Iran. This bathhouse was built during the reign of Ahmad Shah Qajar by Haji Mohammad Ibrahim Khansari. A variety of decorated tiles in the building display designs of humans, animals, and plants. Drawings and paintings depicting the four seasons of the year in the four corners of the bathhouse are the reason for its name. It is the only bathhouse where a separate part is devoted to religious minorities. Four Seasons Bathroom is recorded in the National Heritage List.
