= Navard Aluminium =

Navard Aluminum Manufacturing Group
- Company type: Public
- Industry: Aluminium
- Founded: 1972
- Headquarters: Arak, Iran
- Area served: Worldwide
- Products: Checkered Coil & Sheet; Clad (Aluminium Brazing Sheet); Coil & Strip; Composite Panel; Sandwich panel; Sheet & Plate; Sinusoidal & Trapezoidal Sheets
- Website: www.navardaluminum.com

Navard Aluminium Mfg. Group is an Iranian Aluminium manufacturer located in Arak. The group exports non-alloy aluminium mainly to Canada, Germany, Japan, Iraq, Qatar, Turkey, and the United Arab Emirates.

== Information ==
Navard Aluminum was established in the year of 1972. The company itself covers an area of 220,000 square meters. Navard Aluminum provides the production of semi-finished and finished aluminum flat products. Navard Aluminum sell their products domestically and internationally to the countries of Germany, Qatar, United Arab Emirates, Turkey, Canada, and Iraq.

== Products ==
The products that Navard Aluminium produces include the following:

- Hot Rolled Coils and plate
- Plates
- Cold Rolled Coils
- Strips
- sheet and foil
- Tread Coil
- Embossed Sheets
- Irrigation Tubes
- Trapezoidal Sheets
- Sinusoidal Corrugated Sheets
- Composite Panel (ALUCONAM)
- Clad (Aluminum Brazing Sheet)
- polykraft sheets and coils and corrugated sheet *32 and *5 mm
- painted sheet and coils
- checkered sheet and coil
