= Lajvar Industrial Group =

Lajvar Company
- Company type: Conglomerate
- Industry: Heavy Industry; Machinery; Hydraulics
- Founded: 1985
- Headquarters: Arak, Iran
- Area served: Middle East and Europe
- Products: Hydraulic Cylinders; Pneumatic Cylinders; Line Trucks; Telescopic Cranes; Truck-mounted Cranes
- Revenue: ▲US$2.5 million
- Website: www.lajvar.ir

LAJVAR Industrial Group is an Iranian crane manufacturing company that was established in 1985 in Arak. Products include truck-mounted cranes, telescopic cranes, hydraulic cylinders, pneumatic cylinders and line trucks. This company exports its products mainly to Romania, Azerbaijan, UAE, Sudan, Kuwait, Qatar, Jordan and Armenia.

Lajvar is the largest crane manufacturer in the Middle East.
