= Arak University of Technology =

University in Arak, Iran

Coordinates: 34.0800°N 49.7000°E

- دانشگاه صنعتی اراک
- Established: 1988
- Director: Mojtaba Goudarzi
- Location: Arak, Iran
- Website: www.arakut.ac.ir/en

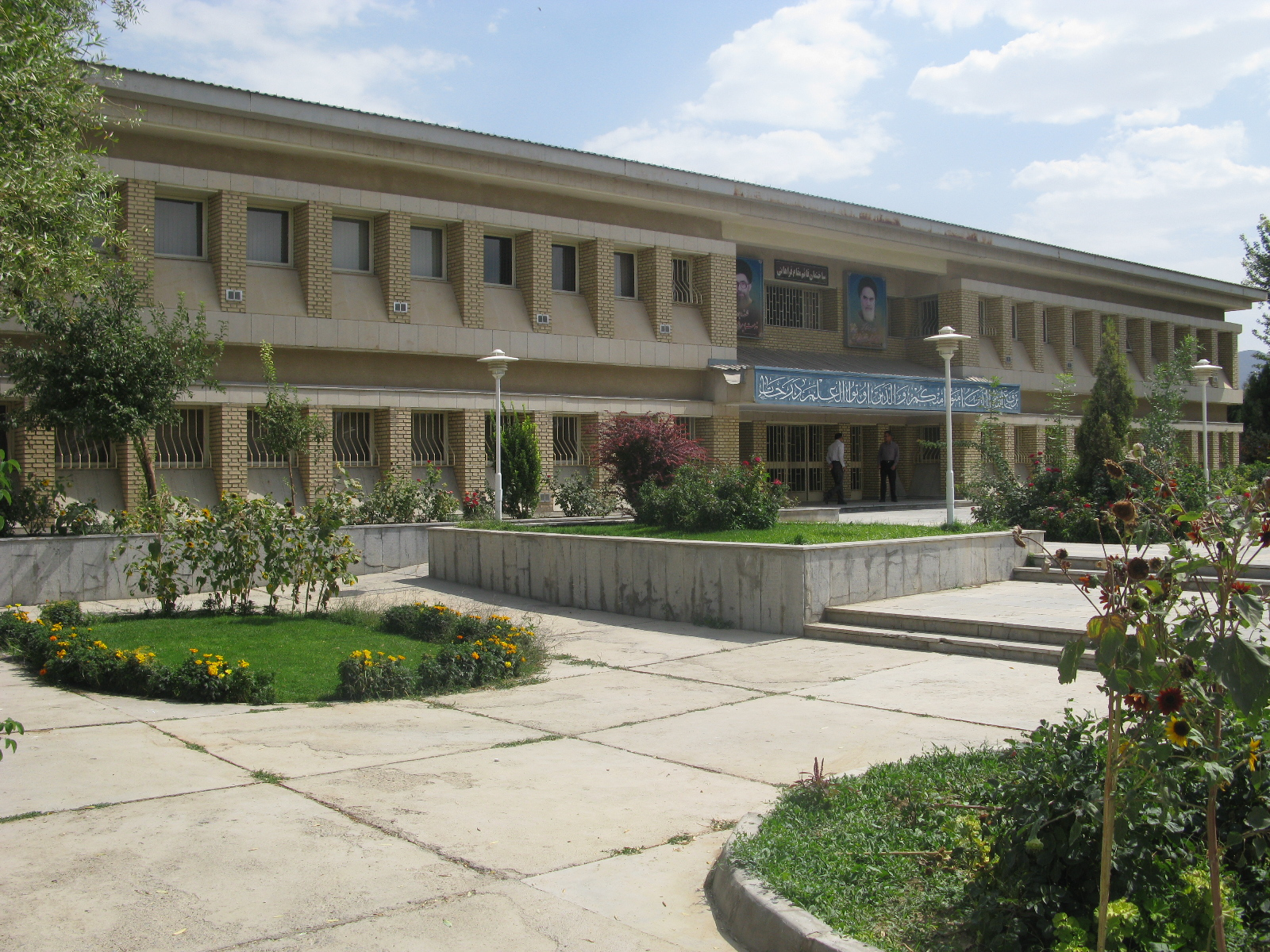
University building

Arak University of Technology (Persian: دانشگاه صنعتی اراک, Danshgah-e Sân'ti-ye Arak), formerly known as Iran University of Science and Technology, Arak Branch, is one of the engineering universities in Iran, located in the city of Arak.

== History ==
The university was founded in 1988.

== Departments ==
Departments
Department	Discipline	B.Sc.	M.Sc.	PhD.
Mechanical Engineering	Manufacturing Engineering	*	*	*
Mechanical Engineering	Heating, Ventilation and Air Conditioning	*	*	*
Electrical Engineering	Power Electronics and Power systems	*	*	
Geo-Engineering Sciences	Mineral Discovery	*	*	*
Civil Engineering	Geomatics Engineering	*	*	
Science	Physics, Mathematics, Nano			
