= Arak Airport =

Airport in Iran

Arak International Airport
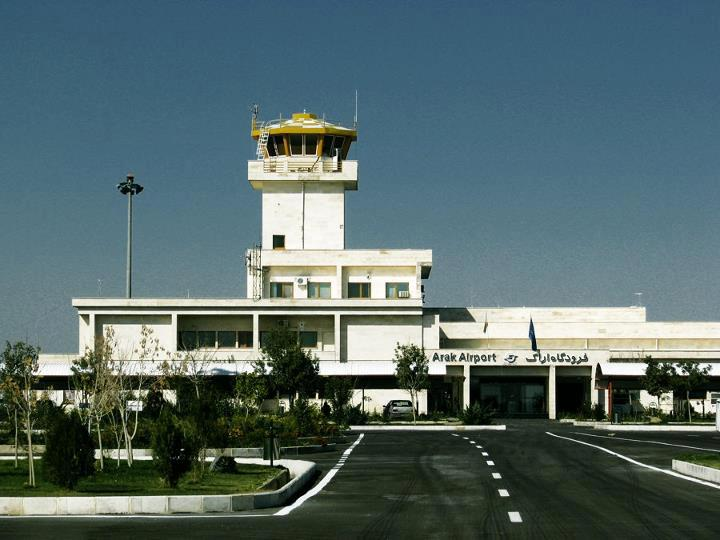
- IATA: AJK; ICAO: OIHR

Summary
- Airport type: Public
- Owner: Government of Iran
- Operator: Iran Airports Company
- Serves: Arak, Markazi
- Location: Arak, Iran
- Opened: 1938
- Elevation AMSL: 5,453 ft (1,662 m)
- Coordinates: 34°08′17″N 49°50′50″E
- Website: arak.airport.ir

Map
- Location of airport in Iran

Runways
Direction	Length		Surface
Direction	ft	m	Surface
08/26	12,139	3,700	Paved

Statistics (2015)
- Aircraft Movements: 136
- Passengers: 17,204
- Cargo: 142 tons
- Source: Iranian Airports Holding Company

Arak Airport (IATA: AJK, ICAO: OIHR) is an international airport in Arak, the capital of Markazi Province in Iran. The airport, one of the oldest in Iran, was opened in 1938.

== History ==
The airport was established by the Britain in 1938 and named Sultanabad (the former name of Arak). Following the establishment of the consulates of England, Germany, and Switzerland and companies such as Ziegler & Co. in Arak, the British thought of establishing an airport due to the city's distance from the sea and maritime facilities as well as major airports.

During World War II and following the Anglo-Soviet invasion of Iran, the airport was used by Britain and its allies for military purposes.

In 1970s, the airport became international when Iran Air operating a scheduled international flight, which connect Arak to Middle East and Europe. however, the service was ended in 1980s.

With the arrival of a Boeing 707 aircraft carrying the former President of Iran, Mahmoud Ahmadinejad on 9 June 2013, Arak airport was officially re-opened along with a new runway and apron. The runway, 3,700 meters long and over 75 meters wide, has all the facilities for the takeoff and landing of all classes of aircraft.

== Airlines and destinations ==
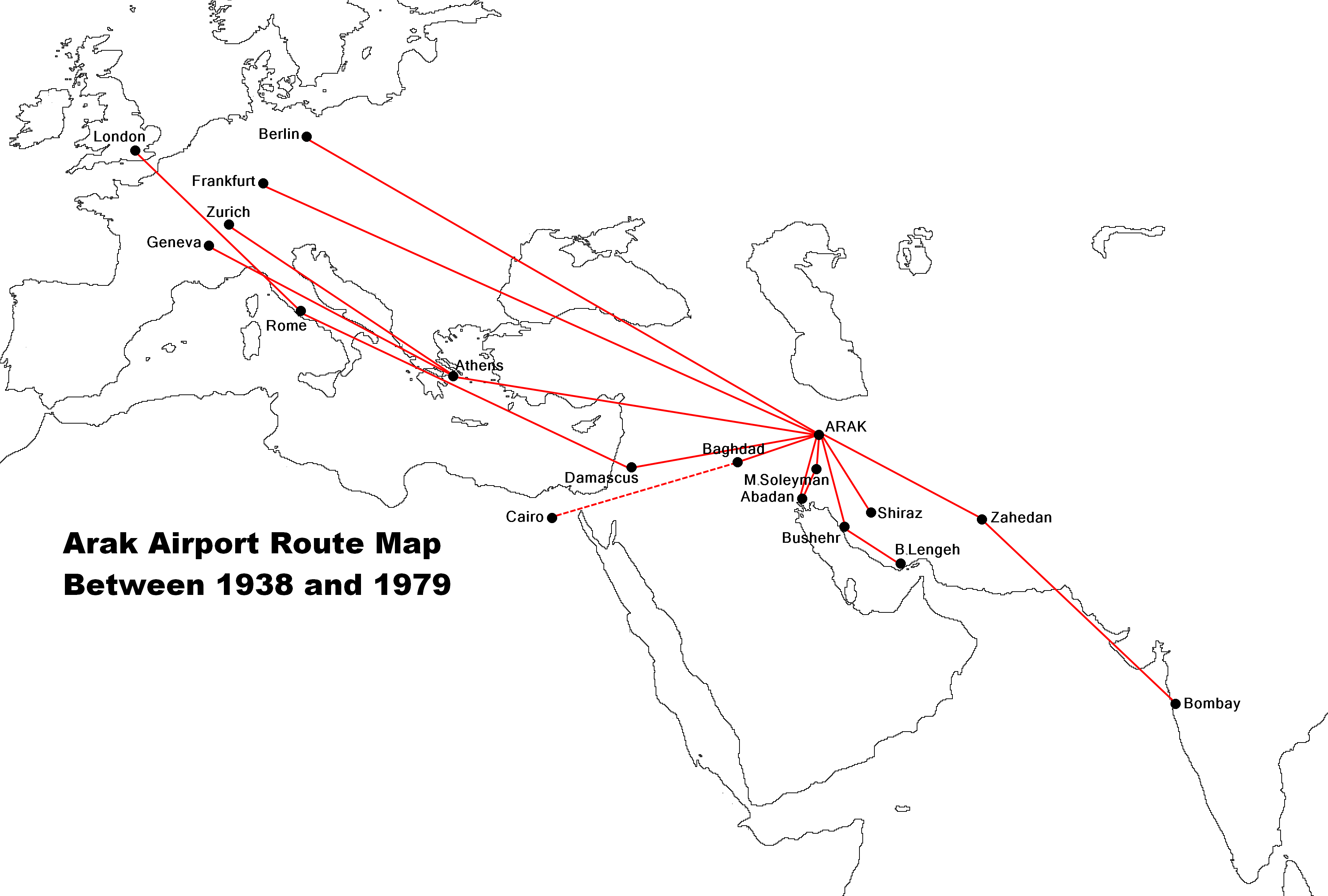
Arak Airport Route map between 1938 and 1979

Airlines	Destinations
Asa Jet	Asaluyeh

== Statistics ==
No	Year	Aircraft Movements	Freights (Ton)	Passengers	Change
1	2017	318	229	28,536	▲142%
2	2016	152	87	11,780	▼31%
3	2015	136	142	17,204	▲192%
4	2014	92	63	5,900	▲100%
5	2013	0	0	0	▼100%
6	2012	24	8	1,308	▼80%
7	2011	94	45	6,645	
