= Arak University =

Public research university in Arak, Iran

- دانشگاه اراک; Danushgah-e Arak
- Type: Public research university
- Established: 1971; 55 years ago
- President: Professor Dr. Hossein Sadeghi
- Location: Arak, Markazi Province, Iran
- Website: www.araku.ac.ir

Arak University is a public research university which is the oldest state university of Markazi province in Iran. The university was founded in 1971 in Arak as The College of Marjan (مدرسه عالی مرجان) with the partnership of the University of Tehran and Tehran Tarbiat Moallem University. In 1989, the college attained university status. The university currently offers degrees in seven faculties in 135 fields for both undergraduate and graduate students.

Arak University is the largest state university of the Markazi province with more than 7,500 students enrolled in its bachelor, master, and PhD programs and more than 300 full-time professors working in eight faculties of the university.

== Colleges ==
The university is organized into several colleges and departments. The College of Science includes Biology, Mathematics, Chemistry, and Physics. The College of Engineering offers programs in Chemical, Mechanical, Industrial, Materials Science, Computer, Civil, and Electrical Engineering.

The College of Human Science covers Theology, Education, History, and Psychology. The College of Agriculture and Environment includes departments like Agricultural Machinery, Water Science, Animal Science, Environmental Science, Horticulture, and Medicinal Plants.

Other colleges include Sport Sciences (Physical Education), Literature and Foreign Languages (Persian, Arabic, and English), Art (Graphics, Drawing, Carpet, Handicrafts), and Economy and Administrative Sciences (Economy, Political Science, Management, Law).
