= Arak–Qom high-speed rail =

Under construction high-speed rail

Overview
- Native name: راه‌آهن تندرو اراک-قم
- Status: Under construction
- Owner: Islamic Republic of Iran Railways
- Locale: Markazi Province, Qom Province; Iran
- Termini: Arak; Qom
- Stations: 2 (Planned)

Service
- Type: High-speed rail

Technical
- Line length: 117 km (73 mi)
- Track gauge: 1,435 mm (4 ft 8 1/2 in) standard gauge
- Electrification: Overhead catenary
- Operating speed: 300 km/h

Arak–Qom high-speed rail is the second high-speed rail project in Iran which will have a junction with Tehran–Qom–Isfahan high-speed rail at one of the stations in Qom province. The Islamic Republic of Iran Railways signed a €1.2 billion deal with its Italian counterpart for establishing a high-speed railroad between the Iranian cities of Qom and Arak. Iran decided to delegate the project to the Chinese following the withdrawal of an Italian firm due to US sanctions on Iran. This new high-speed line, part of the Iran national railway network, will be a double track passenger railway line and will have an operational speed of 300 km/h (190 mph).
