= Avangan =

- Industry: Power engineering
- Headquarters: Arak, Iran
- Key people: Worldwide
- Products: Electric transmission towers; Radio masts and towers; Grating
- Website: https://avangannm.com/

Avangan is an Iranian manufacturer of Electric transmission towers and Radio masts and towers in Arak. This company was established in 1974 by IDRO Group and the Ministry of Energy of Iran. Avangan has 80% of Iran's market in the transmission towers.
