= Zhaleh Alamtaj Qaem-Maqami =

Feminist Iranian poet (1883-1947)

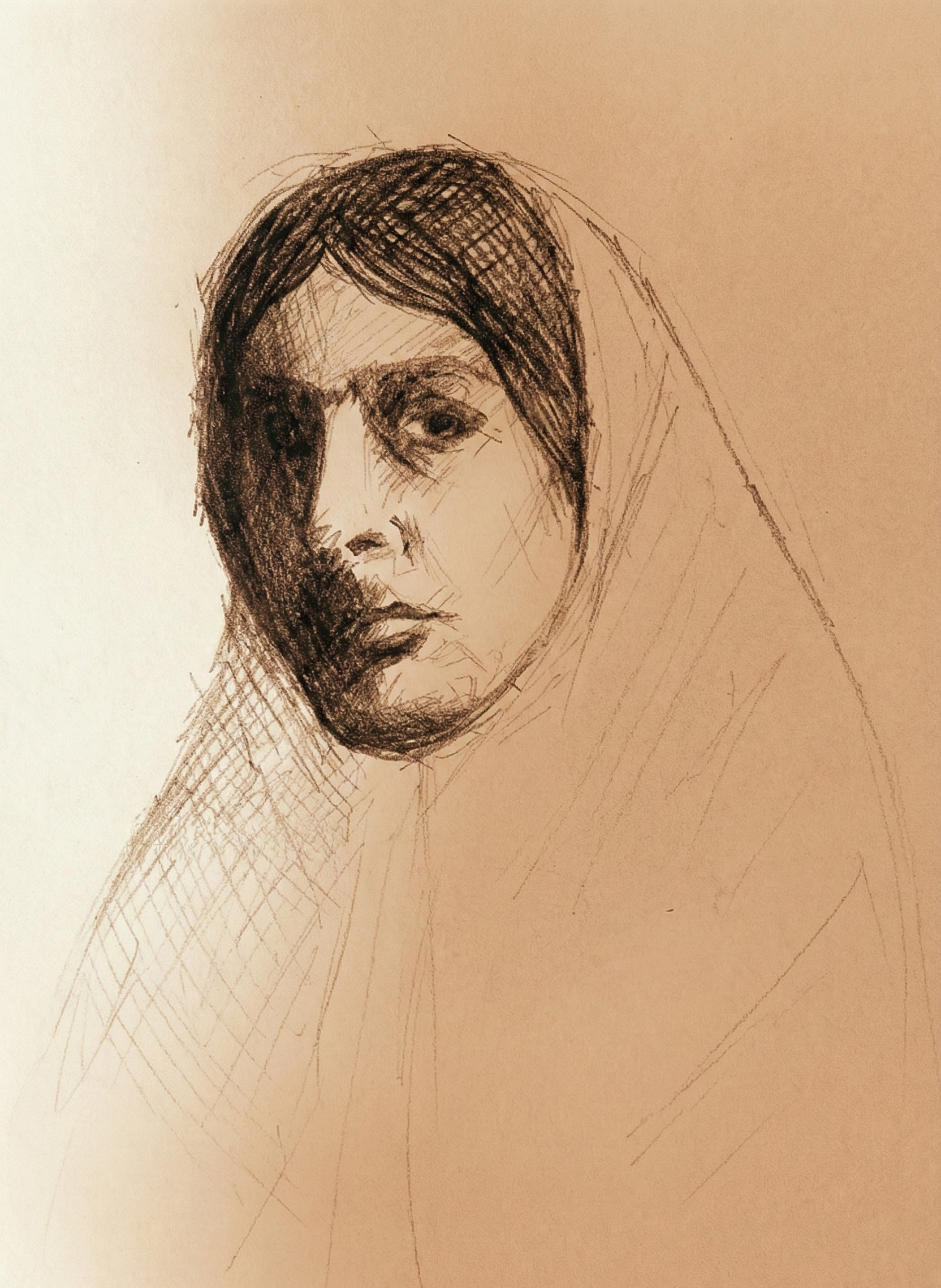
Illustration of Zhaleh Alamtaj Qaem-Maqami

Zhaleh Alamtaj Qaem-Maqami (Persian: ژاله عا‌لمتاج قائمّقامی, romanized: ʻĀlamtāj Qāʼem-maqāmī (Žāle), also romanized: "Alamtaj Qaem-Maqami"; 1883 in Farahan County, Arak – September 27, 1947) was one of the first Iranian female poets who showed her feminist attitudes in her poetry. The book Mirror of Dew was the first translation of her poems into English.

== Life ==
Zhaleh was born in 1883 in Farahan to Gohar-Malek and Mirza Fathollah. Mirza Fathollah was the great-grandchild of Abol-Qasem Qa'em-Maqam, who had been the Iranian Prime Minister briefly from 1834 to 1835. When Zhaleh was 5, she started learning how to read Persian and Arabic, and studied other fields till she was 15. When she was 15, she moved to Tehran with her family in 1938. Her family forced her to marry her father's friend, Alimoradkhan Bakhtiari. Alimorad was working in the military. He was 40 years old. He had daughters from her ex-wife. When Zhaleh married him, the daughters were older than her. After their coercive marriage, Zhaleh gave birth to Hossein Pezhman Bakhtiari. After two or three years, Zhaleh got divorced. At first, Hossein lived with his father until he was 27 years old. Then he lived with his mother till the end of his life.

Asghar Seyed-Gohrab says, "Zhale was married off, at fifteen, to a man she loathed. The cultured and well-educated young woman was completely mismatched with the much older military man, who already had other wives. The death of her parents during the first year of her marriage, and the birth of a son, presumably compounded the trauma. She did then soon divorce the man."

After her divorce, Zhaleh continued living in Farahan. Her departure from her child had impacts on her emotions. Her feelings, depression, and gloomy life are all seen in her poems. Her personal hidden feelings are reflected in one of her poems about her son. Thus subjectivity and womanhood first featured in Zhaleh's poems.

She died at the age of 63, at 1 PM, 27 September 1947. She was buried in Imamzadeh Hassan, in the western parts of Tehran. Zhaleh was one of the critical and idealistic female poets. When she was 23, the Persian Constitutional Revolution had taken place. During that period of time, Iranian society had held conservative views towards women, as well as their social activities. This made her portray her protesting voice against the submissive role of women in her poetry. This way she helped women of her time get rid of the limitations. Her poetry was concerned about patriarchal society which suppressed women and deprived them of their rights.

== Works ==
She was the first female poet who dared to talk about her personal problems. Her poetry was not published for many years. She wrote her poems for herself. She even buried a significant number of her poems. After multiple years since they were written, her son finally collected her poems and got them published. Asghar Seyed-Gohrab writes that she denied that she was a poet even though a few of her works were published in 1993. He suggests, "She might be called the Emily Dickinson of Persian poetry".

Her poetry is mostly autobiographical, a reflection of the tragedies and hardships that she went through in her personal life. She aimed to describe her protests against the stereotypes, beliefs, and expectations prevalent with regards to defending women's rights. In her poetry, she portrays women's struggles with inequality between the genders in terms of positions and rights.

Zhaleh was described as an introspected poet; even though she lived in melancholy and gloomy situations, she wrote her poems while breaking the stereotypes and traditions about women. She hid her poetic skills during her life even from her son Pezhman. Pezhman wrote that she spent the later parts of her life reading books about literature, history, and astronauts.

According to research in national magazines, there were a few or no research conducted into her works and poetry. Even feminist scholars and researchers had not paid enough attention to her. Maryam Khalili Jahantigh and Mahsa Ghadir wrote an article comparing Zhaleh and Emily Dickinson's life and poetry. The article claims that there are similarities between the two poets in terms of their life and experiences, as well as in their poetry.

== List of some of her works ==
- Reproach to my Husband
- Message to the Unborn
- What Would Have Happened?
