= Sultanabad rugs and carpets =

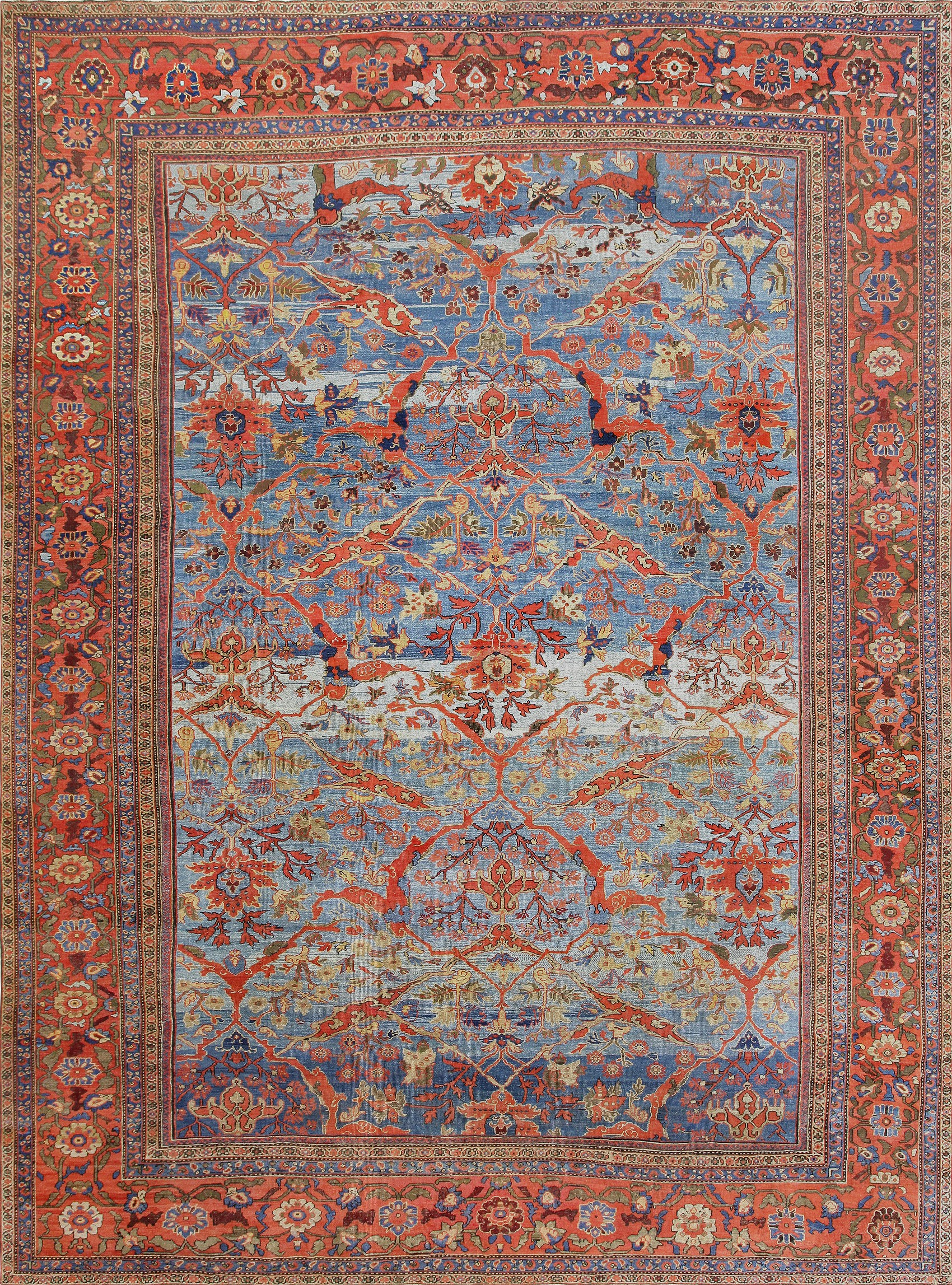
Antique Persian Sultanabad Rug with a Blue Field

Sultanabad rugs and carpets are floor coverings of distinctive design made in Arak, Iran (formerly known as Soltân Âbâd or Sultanabad) since the 19th century.

== History ==
The city of Sultanabad (now known as Arak) was founded in 1808 and later became the major center of rug production in Iran.

=== Ziegler & Co. ===
Beginning in the second half of the nineteenth century, a large increase in demand for Persian rugs by Western consumers transformed a millennia old art form. During the late 19th century, in 1883, the Manchester, England, based Anglo-Swiss firm of Ziegler & Co. established a manufactory, the sole objective of which was to produce Sultanabad rugs to meet western tastes and demands. Western designers modified classical Persian designs, marking the first time westerners directly affected Persian designs (beyond influence through market demand). In step with the beginning of the Arts and Crafts Movement, Ziegler modified designs to be larger size, along with a larger rug size to suit western room specifications. Arak's palette changed, as colors were softened in an effort to appeal to European and American tastes.

== Designs ==
Most similar to the Sultanabads are Heriz and Serapi rugs; this similarity being attributed to the magnificent graphic character of the designs. Yet within this similarity, the line work of the Heriz/Serapis is always more curvilinear and classical. Sultanabads share with Persian rugs all-over designs of palmettes and vinescrolls, but as they use a larger, suppler weave, the Sultanabad designs tend to be larger as well.

=== Dye ===
The most popular color of the Sultanabad repertoire was a deep rose red. The red dye was created by bathing wool for two days in madder and whey after which it was scoured for nearly another two days with running water.

=== Other designs from Arak region ===
Other types of Sultanabad designs may include production from Mushkabad. Farahan, Sarouk and Garous were also made in the Arak region, though are wholly different.
