= Radio Deutschland =

UK propaganda radio station during WWII

Radio Deutschland was a radio station in the UK during World War II that broadcast propaganda to the German nation and its armed services. The station broadcast on a frequency close to well-known German radio stations, so German people would tune in by accident, and be lulled into its content. Many German people believed it was a real German radio station.

== See also ==
- Radio 1212
