= Tehran–Qom–Isfahan high-speed rail =

High-speed rail project in Iran

- Ministry: Minister of road and urban development
- Budget: 48 billion Yuan or 57 billion Yuan

Tehran–Qom–Isfahan high-speed rail

Overview
- Native name: راه‌آهن تندرو تهران-قم-اصفهان
- Status: Under construction
- Owner: Islamic Republic of Iran Railways
- Locale: Tehran Province, Qom Province, Isfahan Province; Iran
- Termini: Tehran; Isfahan
- Stations: 4 (Planned)

Service
- Type: High-speed rail

Technical
- Line length: 410 km (250 mi)
- Track gauge: 1,435 mm (4 ft 8 1/2 in) standard gauge
- Electrification: Overhead catenary
- Operating speed: 300 km/h
Route map
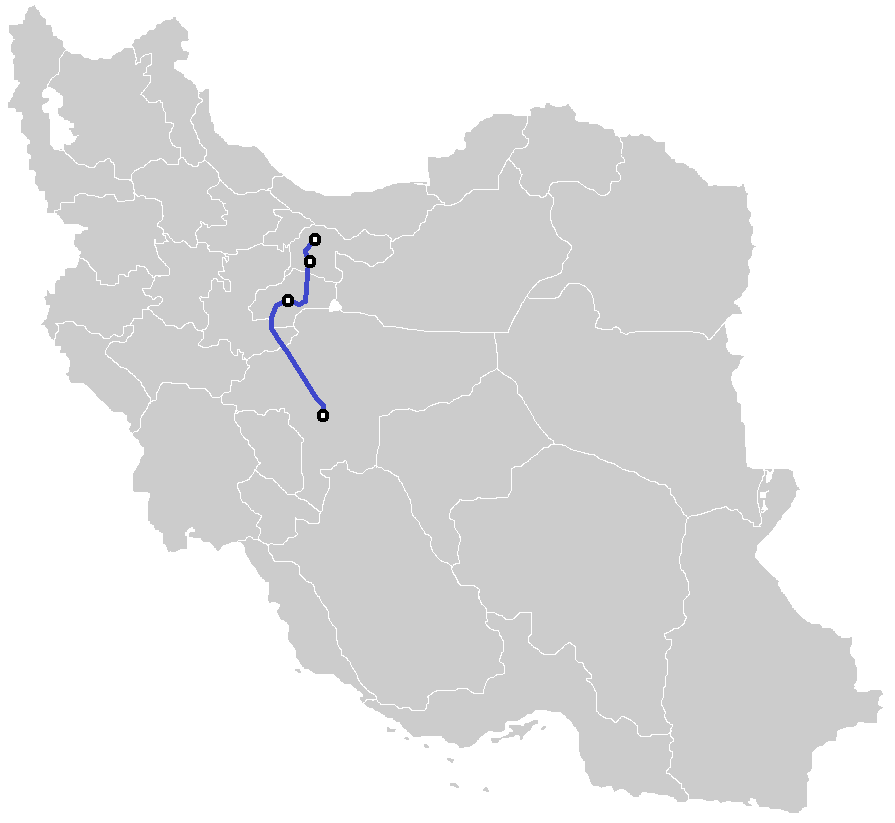

Tehran–Qom–Isfahan high-speed rail is the first truly high-speed rail project in Iran. Construction began on 25 February 2015. The rail line would decrease travel times between Tehran and Isfahan, passing through Qom. It connects Isfahan and Qom to Imam Khomeini International Airport.

The project is implemented by a Chinese consortium led by the China Railway Engineering Corporation. Completion was planned in 2021. In June 2022, the high speed rail line was not operating, but a spokesperson said that it will be operational within the end of the 13th Government, which is the Government of Ebrahim Raisi, elected in 2021. Therefore, the railway should become operational in around 2025.

== Concept ==
This line was the first high-speed railway proposed after the Islamic Revolution, in about 1990. The available technology allowed speeds of 270 km/h as in TGV in France and ICE in Germany.

After accepting the proposal for electrification of Tehran–Mashhad railway and increasing the target speed to 200 for locomotive-hauled trains and 250 for EMU, Tehran-Esfahan high-speed was studied for increasing the speed in 2006.

The available technology and standard at that time was suitable to go to 350 km/h. This was proposed to the road and transportation minister. The subject was referred to a consultant, and the geometry of track was studied again and was found acceptable for 350 for 70% of the Qom to Isfahan.

== Stations ==
- Tehran railway station
- Imam Khomeini International Airport Terminal 2 and 3 Railway Station (planned)
- Qom New railway station (planned)- Intersection with Arak–Qom high-speed rail
- Isfahan-North railway station (planned)

== Project status ==
The Iranian government has been planning this railway since 1990. It would have only cost 1.4 million euros but the project has been derailed since by political administrations.

By 2023, 60% to 70% of the foundation (150 kilometer out of 245 kilometer) was done according to the government.

The government added Shiraz and Mashhad to this lane.

When it is accomplished, the Chinese government will build new high speed rail infrastructure.

== See also ==
- High-speed rail in Iran
