= Ziegler & Co. =

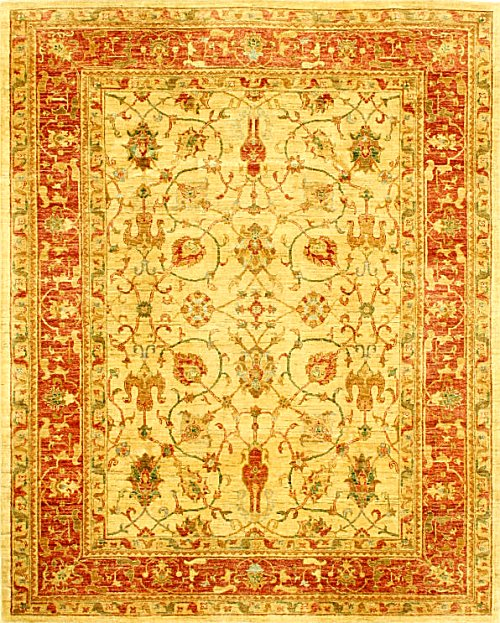
Ziegler-style carpet

Ziegler & Co. was a Manchester-based Anglo-Swiss producer and distributor of Persian carpets in the late nineteenth and early twentieth centuries. The company had workshops in Tabriz and Sultanabad (now Arak), and it supplied retailers such as Liberty & Company and Harvey Nichols.

"Ziegler carpets" long ago became a term used to refer to this style of carpet. Modern-day Ziegler-style carpets are being produced in many countries. Original Ziegler carpets and old carpets with similar designs are often highly valued by collectors.

== See also ==
- Oriental Carpet Manufacturers
- Sultanabad rugs and carpets
