= Arak, Iran =

City in Markazi province, Iran

Arak Persian: اراک
- City
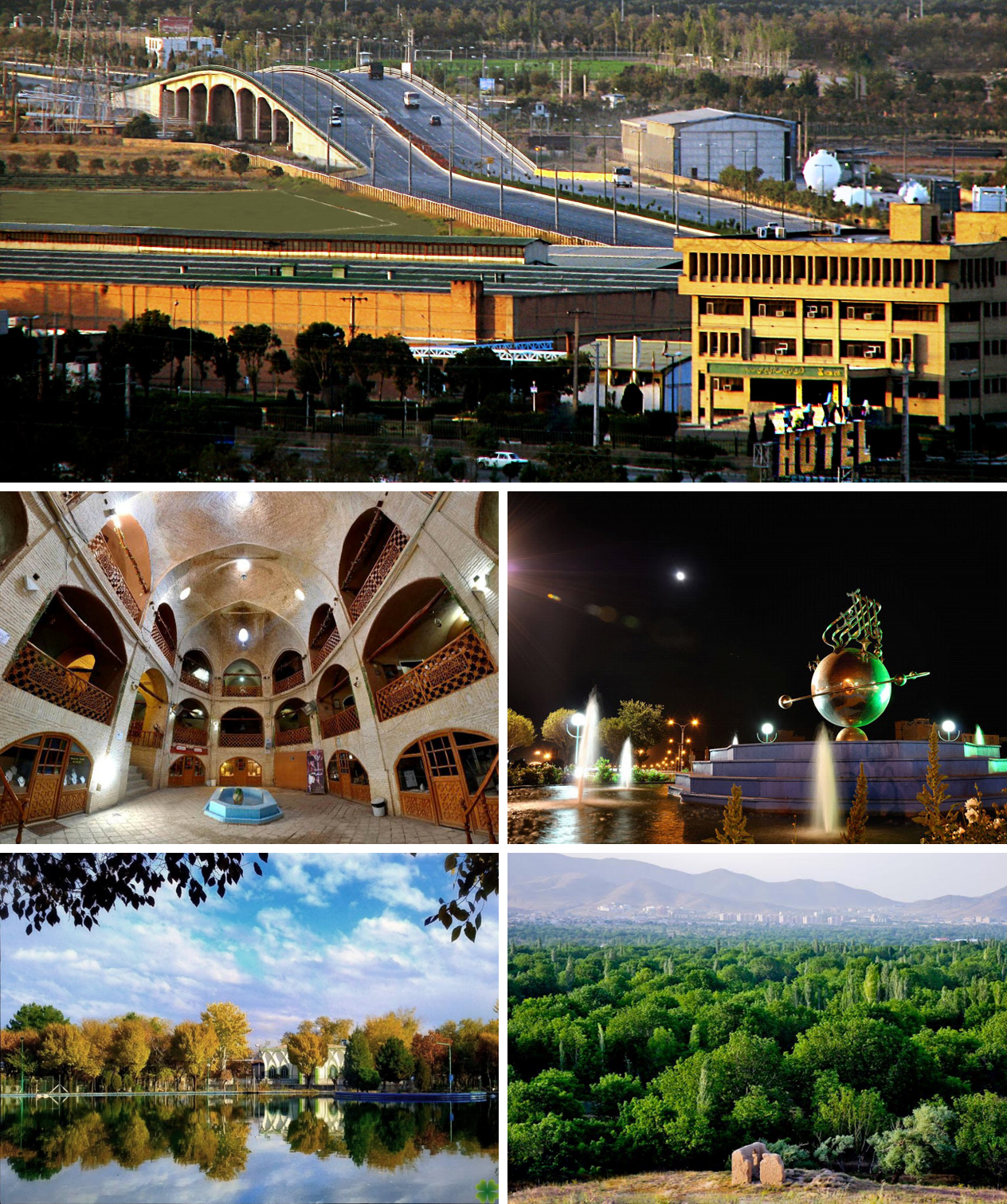
- Clockwise from top: Bakhtyari Bridge, Valiasr Square, Senjan, City Park, and the old bazaar.

- Seal

- Location within Iran
- Coordinates: 34°05′29″N 49°41′36″E
- Country: Iran
- Province: Markazi
- County: Arak
- District: Central
- Established: 1808

Government
  - Mayor: Alireza Mahmoudi
- Elevation: 1,718 m (5,636 ft)

Population (2016)
  - Total: 520,944
  - Population Rank in Iran: 18th
- Time zone: UTC+3:30 (IRST)
- Area code: 086
- Climate: Dsa
- Website: arak.ir

Arak (Persian: اراک; IPA: [æˈɾɒːkʲ]) (Note: Also romanized as Arâk; formerly Soltanabad (سلطان آباد)) is a city in the Central District of Arak County, Markazi province, Iran, serving as capital of the province, the county, and the district.

The city is nicknamed the "Industrial Capital of Iran". Industrial factories include Machine Sazi Arak and the Iranian Aluminium Company, which produce nearly half of the needs of the country in the steel, petrochemical, and locomotive industries.

== Etymology ==
=== Arâk ===
Arâk, as the city has been known since the Middle Ages, derives from Arabic al-ʿIrāq, meaning "root", itself derived possibly from Akkadian Uruk (Hebrew: אֶרֶךְ, Erech). According to Ali Nourai, Arak comes from the same root as Iran and Arran, and Iraq is an Arabicized Persian word.

During the Seljuk era, a region comprising the whole territory of Media (northwestern Iran) and the lower part of Mesopotamia was referred to as Iraq; with the Median part called ʿErâq-e ʿAjam ("Iraq of the Ajam [non-Arabic speakers]"), and the Mesopotamian part called ʿErâq-e ʿArab ("Iraq of the Arabs").

=== Soltân Âbâd ===
The term Soltân Âbâd is a Persian compound word.

Soltân, deriving from Arabic sulṭān ("power", "authority"), is a West Asian noble title given to a powerful governor. Modern Persian âbâd, meaning "settlement" or "abode", derives from Middle Persian āpāt ("populous"). However, according to linguist Sasha Lubotsky, the Persian term ābād might derive from Proto-Iranian *āpāta ("protected"), rooting from Proto-Indo-European *peh₂- ("to protect").

== History ==
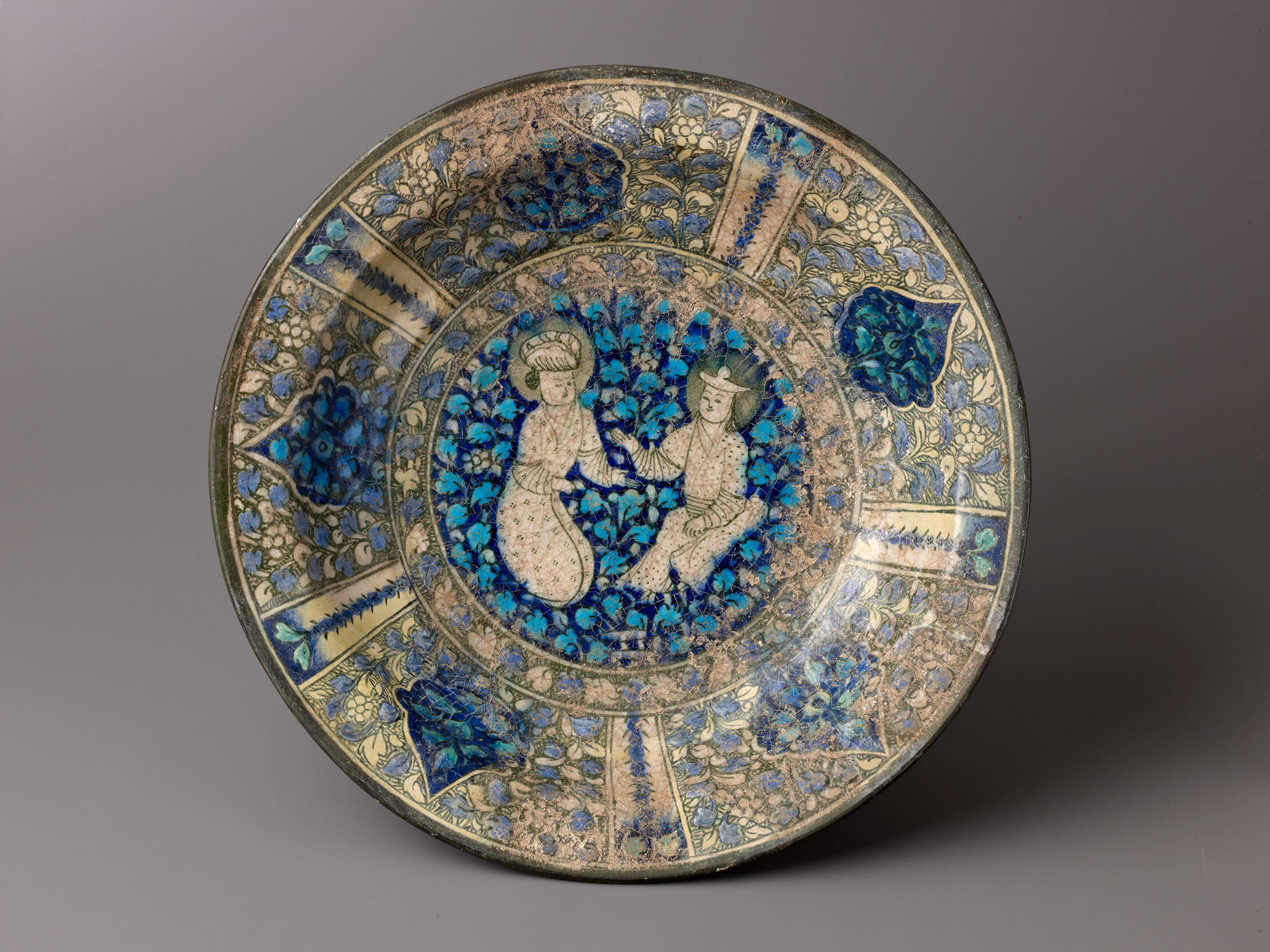
Bowl, Sultanabad ware, first half of the 14th century, fritware, underglaze-painted, Iran. Metropolitan Museum of Art.

Originally named Soltan Abad, the modern-day city of Arak was founded in 1808 by Yusef Khan-e Gorji, a pro-Iranian warlord of Georgian Muslim origin who was given refuge by Qajar ruler Agha Mohammad Khan following a territorial dispute with his cousins, who were supported by Russian empress Catherine the Great.

Between 1795 and 1797, Yusef Khan-e Gorji, renamed Yusef Khan-e Sepahdar by the Qajar ruler, settled his army in the fertile but poorly-controlled territory that would become the modern-day Arak. Hostile tribes in the region had operated autonomously from the Qajar rule. With the Shah's approval, Yusef Khan diverted the main river to drive out the hostiles and build the war fortress of Soltan Abad to act as a buffer. Until 1892, the town remained a military base and fortress. The fortress of Soltan Abad had a thick wall surrounded by 7-meter-deep moats. Eight towers were constructed around the town and the governmental building was established in its northern part.

In 1891, shops, gardens, and government buildings of Soltan Abad were repaired by the order of deputy governor Mirza Hasan (Etemad os-Saltane). Large parts of the city were formerly annexed as personal property to the pre-existing army commanders, and were then ultimately turned over to the state around 1918–1922.

Beginning by the last quarter of the 19th century, the city achieved major developments in carpet industry, and eventually became Iran's most important center of carpet production for export markets, continuing up until at least 1940.

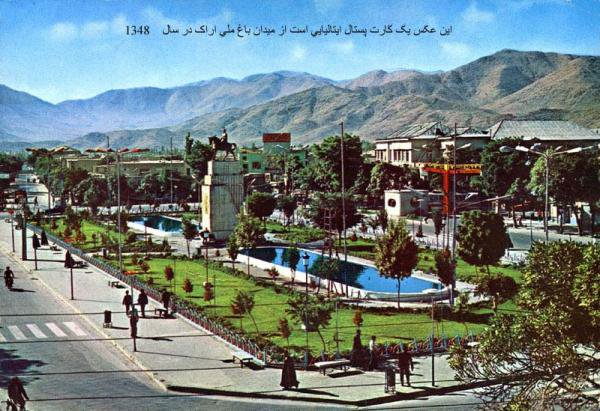
National Garden Square in 1969

Under the reign of Reza Shah of the Pahlavi dynasty, the city was renamed Arak. Modern factories for vegetable oil, soap, sugar beet, and wool industries were established within the city. Arak also became an important station on the Trans-Iranian Railway, a major railway project directed by Reza Shah which was completed in 1938.

In 1972, two major state-owned enterprises were established in the city, including an aluminum smelter and a heavy engineering plant. The aluminum smelter was built under the Regional Cooperation for Development project of the Central Treaty Organization, in cooperation with the company of Reynolds and Reynolds. The engineering plant was processed with equipment and technical advice from the Soviets, in return of gas sales to the Soviet Union.

The city officially became a metropolis on 6 April 2013, after the merger with Karahrud and Senjan.

In June 2025, during the Twelve-Day War, Israel told residents of Arak to evacuate prior to an Israeli strike on the Arak heavy water reactor.

== Demographics ==
=== Population ===
Arak population history
Year	Pop.	±%
1956	58,998	—
1966	71,925	+21.9%
1976	116,832	+62.4%
1986	265,349	+127.1%
1991	331,354	+24.9%
1996	380,755	+14.9%
2006	438,338	+15.1%
2011	484,212	+10.5%
2016	520,944	+7.6%

At the time of the 2006 National Census, the city's population was 438,338 in 121,597 households. The following census in 2011 counted 484,212 people in 148,249 households. The 2016 census measured the population of the city as 520,944 people in 165,709 households.

== Geography ==
=== Location ===
Arak is surrounded by mountains in the south, west, and east, and its average altitude is about 1750m above sea level. It is located 260 km from the city of Tehran, and is in the vicinity of the cities of Qom and Isfahan.

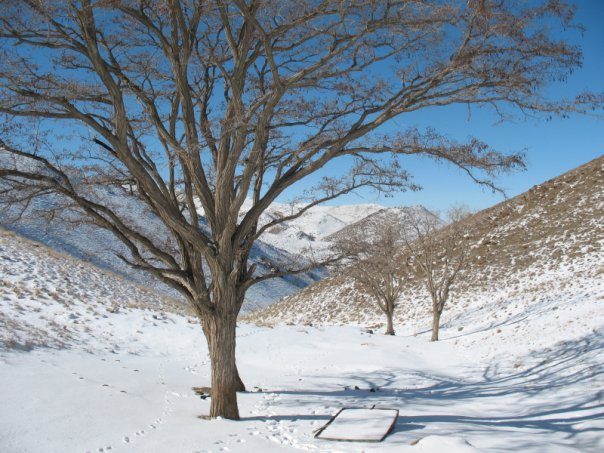
The Gerdoo Valley in winter

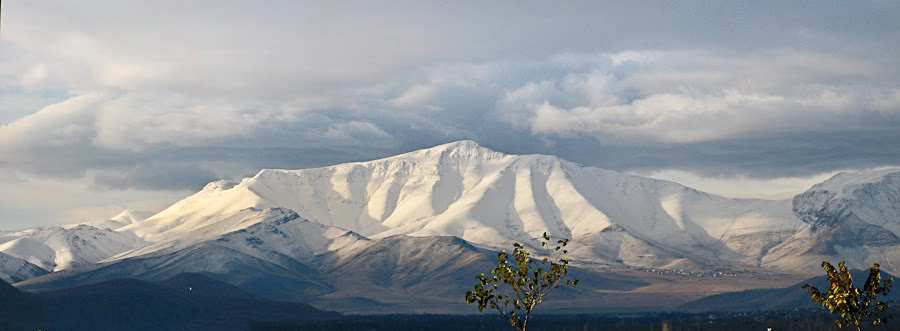
Sefidkhani Mountain, located to the west of Arak

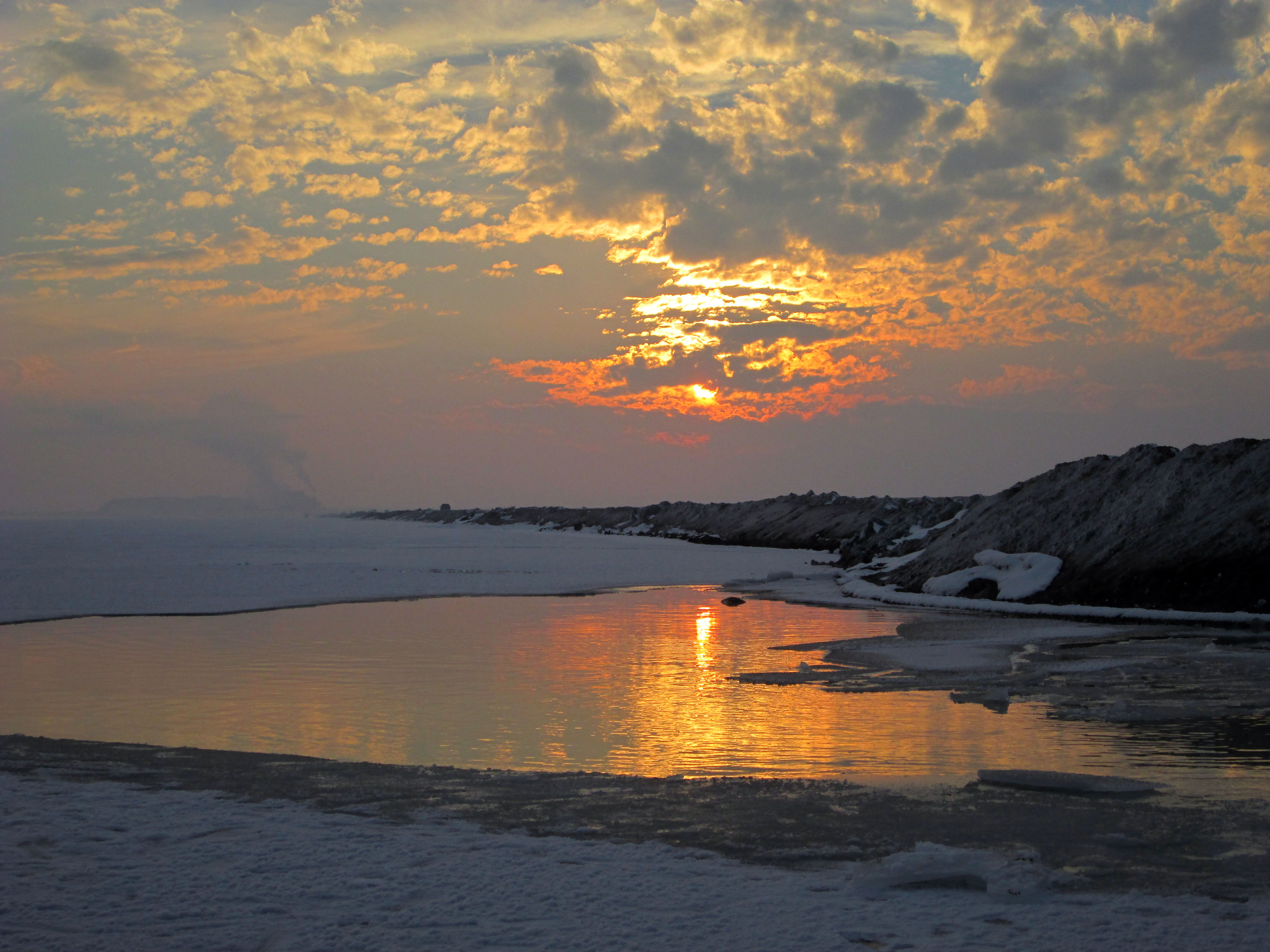
Meyqan Lagoon, 15 km northeast of Arak

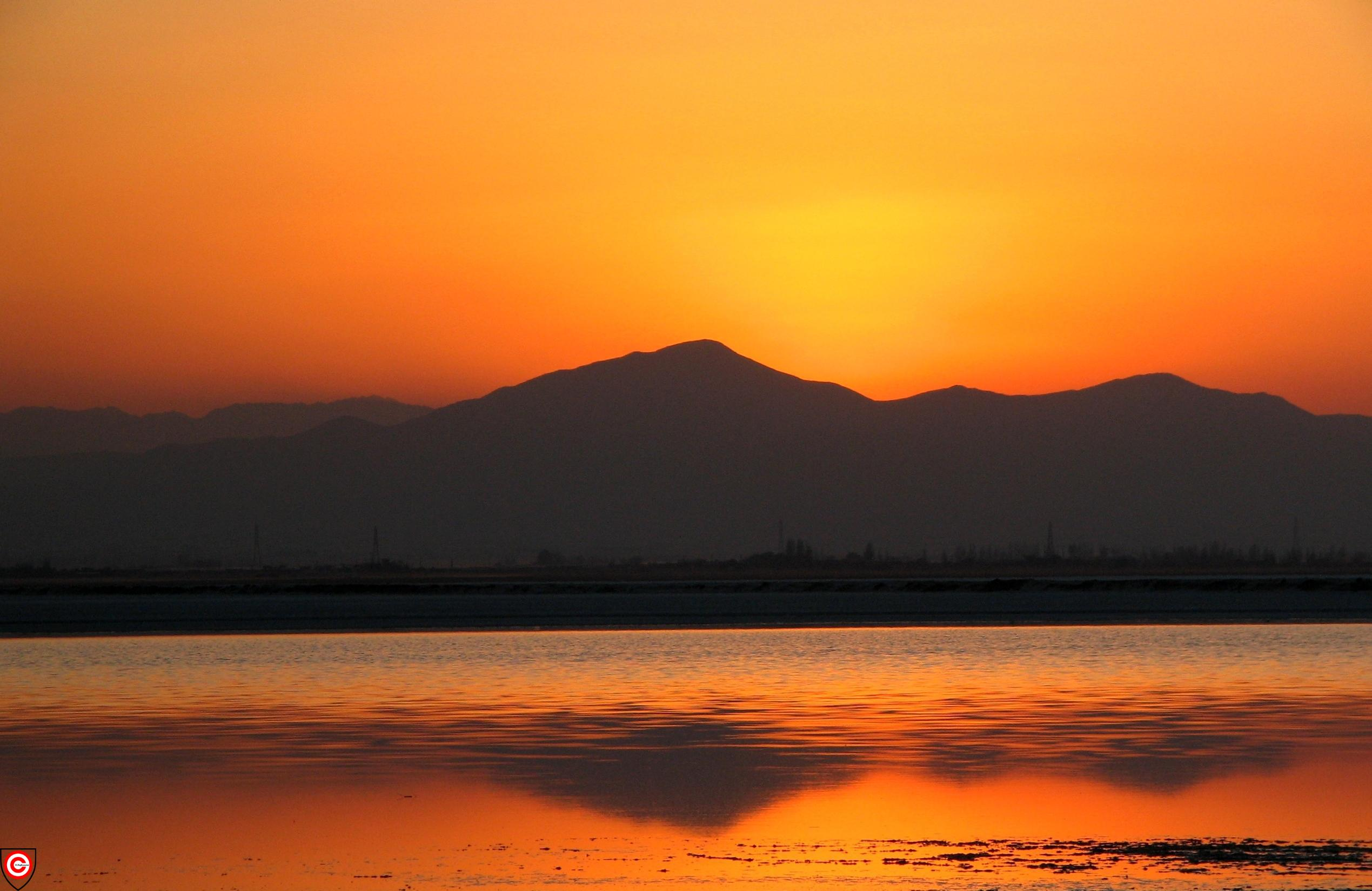
Sunset in Meyqan Lagoon

=== Climate ===
Arak has a hot-summer mediterranean continental climate (Köppen: Dsa, Trewartha: Dcho). The weather of the city is very hot and dry in summer, cool in autumn, cold and snowy in winter, and mild in spring. Its maximum temperature may rise to above 35 °C or 95 °F in summer and fall to below −25 °C or −13 °F in winter. The average annual precipitation is around 337 millimetres or 13.3 inches and the annual relative humidity is about 47%.

Climate data for Arak (1991-2020, extremes 1961-present)
Month	Jan	Feb	Mar	Apr	May	Jun	Jul	Aug	Sep	Oct	Nov	Dec	Year
Record high °C (°F)	18.2 (64.8)	23.6 (74.5)	27.8 (82.0)	31.0 (87.8)	35.4 (95.7)	41.0 (105.8)	44.0 (111.2)	41.3 (106.3)	38.0 (100.4)	31.2 (88.2)	25.0 (77.0)	22.0 (71.6)	44.0 (111.2)
Mean daily maximum °C (°F)	4.9 (40.8)	8.8 (47.8)	14.4 (57.9)	19.9 (67.8)	25.8 (78.4)	32.5 (90.5)	36.7 (98.1)	34.9 (94.8)	30.7 (87.3)	23.4 (74.1)	14.0 (57.2)	8.3 (46.9)	21.2 (70.1)
Daily mean °C (°F)	−1.4 (29.5)	2.8 (37.0)	8.0 (46.4)	13.4 (56.1)	18.7 (65.7)	25.0 (77.0)	28.1 (82.6)	26.9 (80.4)	22.2 (72.0)	15.5 (59.9)	7.5 (45.5)	2.6 (36.7)	14.1 (57.4)
Mean daily minimum °C (°F)	−6.9 (19.6)	−2.5 (27.5)	2.0 (35.6)	7.0 (44.6)	11.3 (52.3)	16.2 (61.2)	19.8 (67.6)	18.5 (65.3)	13.5 (56.3)	8.1 (46.6)	2.0 (35.6)	−2.0 (28.4)	7.3 (45.1)
Record low °C (°F)	−29.6 (−21.3)	−30.5 (−22.9)	−22 (−8)	−7.0 (19.4)	0.0 (32.0)	4.0 (39.2)	12.0 (53.6)	10.0 (50.0)	2.0 (35.6)	−4.0 (24.8)	−17 (1)	−23 (−9)	−30.5 (−22.9)
Average precipitation mm (inches)	36.0 (1.42)	35.5 (1.40)	57.3 (2.26)	55.2 (2.17)	26.9 (1.06)	3.6 (0.14)	1.4 (0.06)	1.7 (0.07)	1.1 (0.04)	17.5 (0.69)	39.1 (1.54)	40.2 (1.58)	315.5 (12.43)
Average precipitation days (≥ 1.0 mm)	5.8	5	6.6	6.8	4.6	0.7	0.5	0.4	0.2	2.7	5.1	5.5	43.9
Average snowy days	7	5.6	2.7	0.3	0	0	0	0	0	0	0.6	4.5	20.7
Average relative humidity (%)	70	62	51	48	40	27	25	24	27	41	60	69	45
Average dew point °C (°F)	−5.9 (21.4)	−4.8 (23.4)	−3.1 (26.4)	1.1 (34.0)	3.1 (37.6)	2.7 (36.9)	4.5 (40.1)	3.4 (38.1)	0.7 (33.3)	0.4 (32.7)	−0.9 (30.4)	−3.4 (25.9)	−0.2 (31.7)
Mean monthly sunshine hours	159	182	217	230	287	338	327	334	304	256	177	153	2,964
Source: NOAA NCEI (snow days 1981-2010) (1961-1990 extremes)

Climate data for Arak
Month	Jan	Feb	Mar	Apr	May	Jun	Jul	Aug	Sep	Oct	Nov	Dec	Year
Record high °C (°F)	17.0 (62.6)	21.0 (69.8)	25.2 (77.4)	29.0 (84.2)	35.0 (95.0)	41.0 (105.8)	44.0 (111.2)	41.0 (105.8)	38.0 (100.4)	31.0 (87.8)	24.0 (75.2)	20.0 (68.0)	44.0 (111.2)
Mean daily maximum °C (°F)	4.9 (40.8)	7.3 (45.1)	13.7 (56.7)	19.7 (67.5)	25.6 (78.1)	32.5 (90.5)	36.7 (98.1)	34.9 (94.8)	30.7 (87.3)	23.2 (73.8)	14.5 (58.1)	7.7 (45.9)	20.9 (69.7)
Daily mean °C (°F)	−1.4 (29.5)	1.9 (35.4)	7.8 (46.0)	13.4 (56.1)	18.2 (64.8)	24.0 (75.2)	28.1 (82.6)	26.4 (79.5)	21.9 (71.4)	15.6 (60.1)	8.4 (47.1)	2.8 (37.0)	13.9 (57.1)
Mean daily minimum °C (°F)	−6.9 (19.6)	−3.4 (25.9)	2.0 (35.6)	7.0 (44.6)	10.9 (51.6)	15.5 (59.9)	19.8 (67.6)	17.9 (64.2)	13.1 (55.6)	7.9 (46.2)	2.4 (36.3)	−2.1 (28.2)	7.0 (44.6)
Record low °C (°F)	−29.6 (−21.3)	−30.5 (−22.9)	−22 (−8)	−7.0 (19.4)	0.0 (32.0)	4.0 (39.2)	12.0 (53.6)	10.0 (50.0)	2.0 (35.6)	−4.0 (24.8)	−17 (1)	−23 (−9)	−30.5 (−22.9)
Average precipitation mm (inches)	51.6 (2.03)	43.3 (1.70)	57.1 (2.25)	53.6 (2.11)	30.0 (1.18)	2.8 (0.11)	1.2 (0.05)	1.6 (0.06)	0.9 (0.04)	16.9 (0.67)	33.7 (1.33)	44.4 (1.75)	337.1 (13.28)
Average rainy days	10.8	9.8	11.4	9.4	7.1	1.1	0.9	0.6	0.6	4.3	6.1	8.9	71
Average snowy days	7.6	6.4	3.2	0.5	0	0	0	0	0	0.1	0.7	4.6	23.1
Average relative humidity (%)	72	66	54	48	41	29	28	27	28	41	57	68	47
Mean monthly sunshine hours	152.0	170.9	206.2	225.7	288.3	345.0	334.8	330.9	305.1	259.3	185.9	154.3	2,958.4
Source: NOAA (1961-1990)

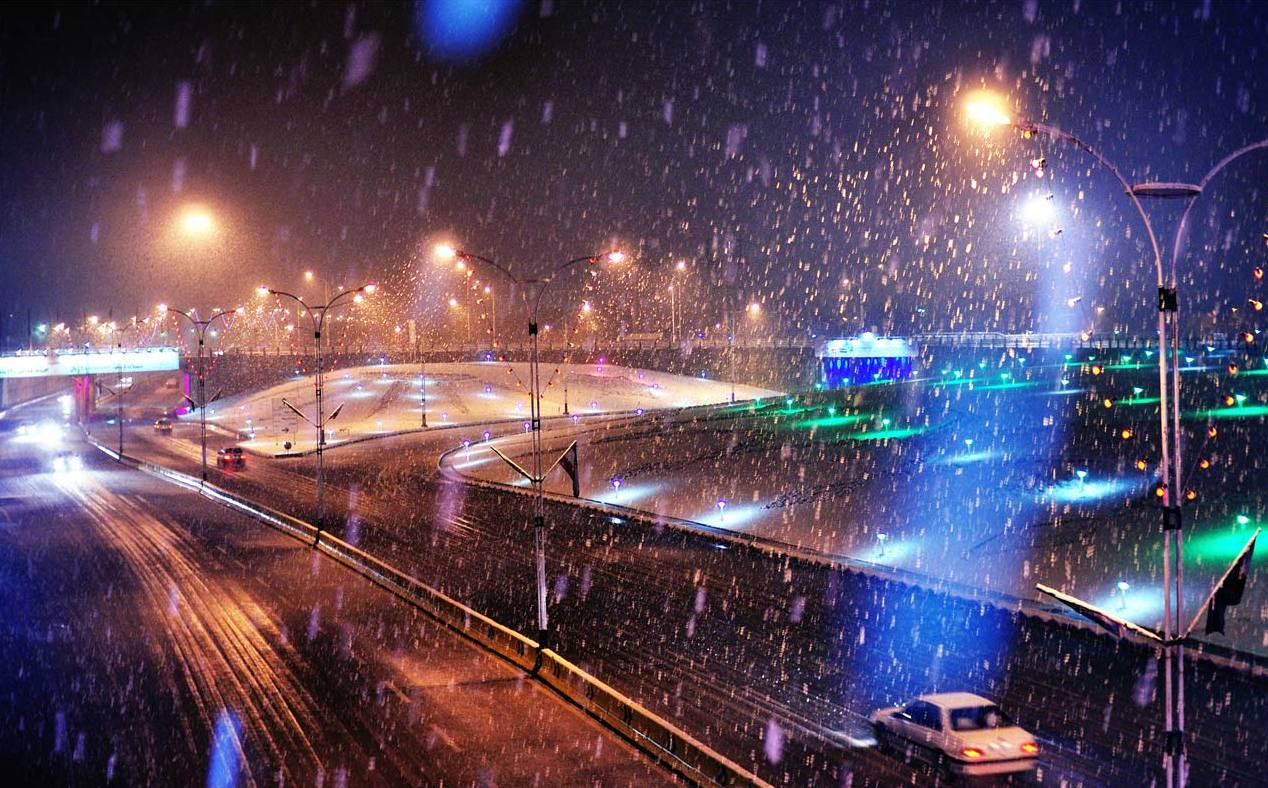
A snowy night in Arak

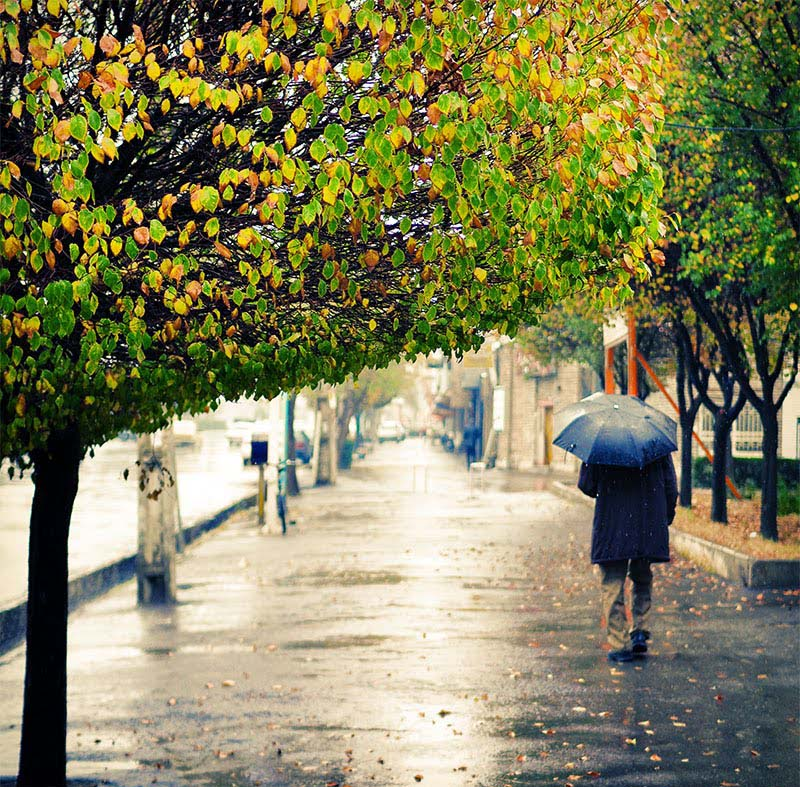
A rainy day in Arak

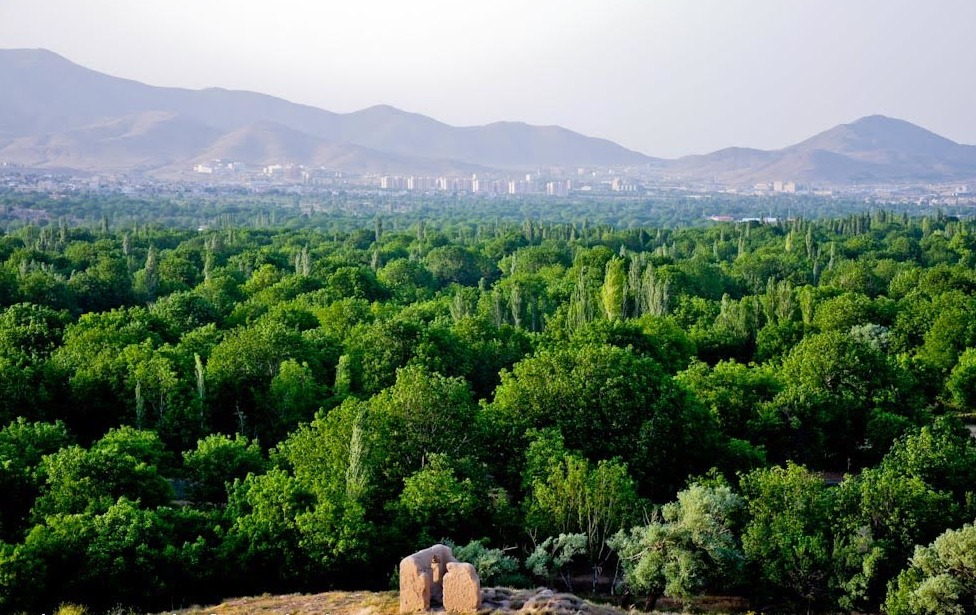
The Senjan district in summer

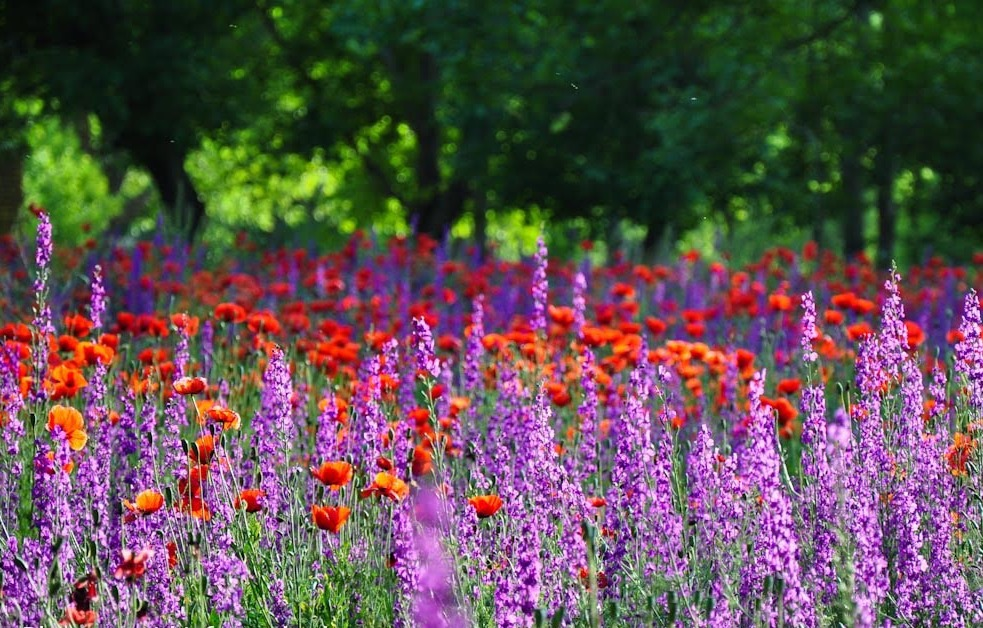
Gardens in Senjan

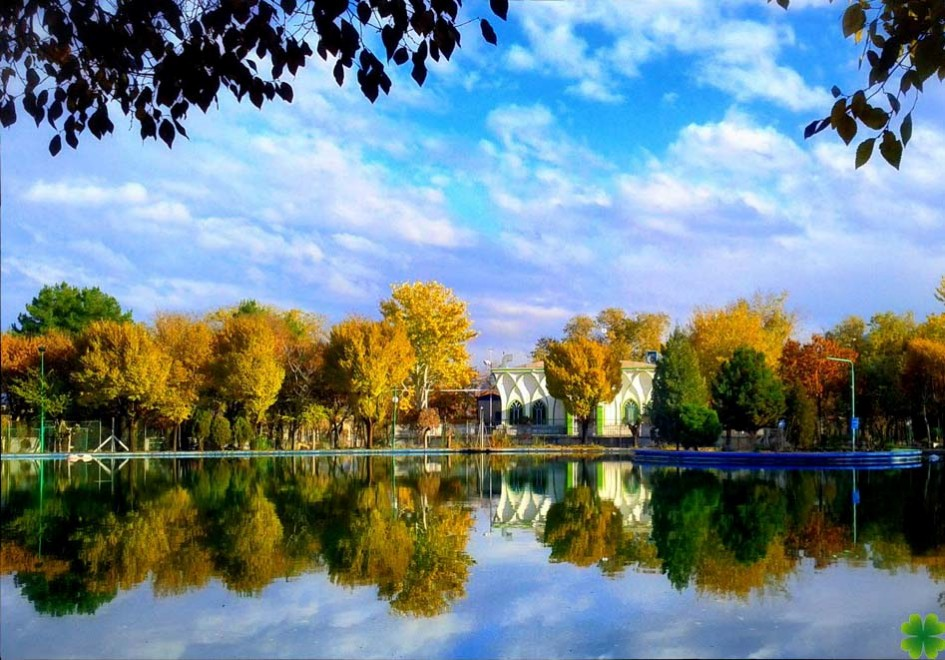
The City Park of Arak in autumn

== Transport ==
=== Airport ===
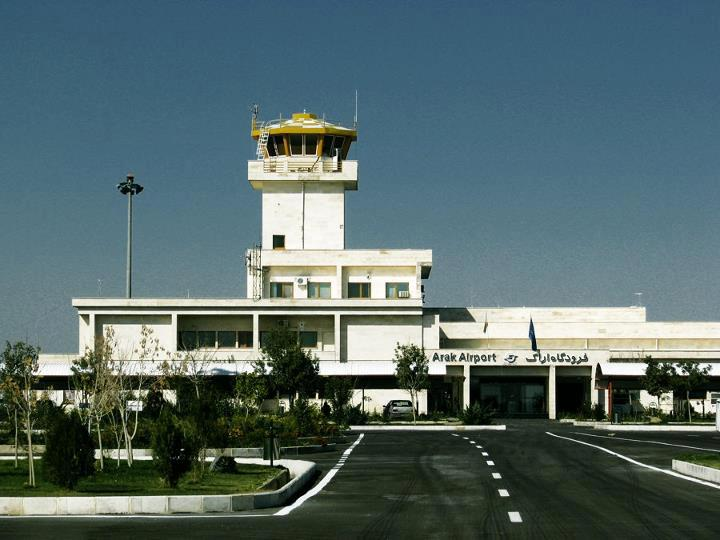
Arak Airport

Arak is served by the International Airport of Arak, which is located north of the city. The airport was opened in 1938, and is one of the oldest airports of Iran.

=== Rail ===
The railway system of Arak was connected to the Iranian Railways in 1935. Destinations stretch directly from Bandar-e-Shapur in the southwestern Iran to Bandar Torkaman under the Caspian Sea.

=== High-speed rail ===
Arak–Qom High Speed Rail is the second high-speed rail project in Iran which will have a junction with Tehran–Qom–Isfahan High Speed Rail at one of the stations in Qom province. The Islamic Republic of Iran Railways signed a €1.2 billion deal with its Italian counterpart for establishing a high-speed railroad between the Iranian cities of Qom and Arak. Iran decided to delegate the project to the Chinese following the withdrawal of an Italian firm due to US sanctions on Iran. This new High Speed Line, part of the Iran National Railway Network, will be a double track passenger railway line and will have an operational speed of 300 km/h.

=== Public transportation ===
Buses provide the bulk of local public transport in Arak.

== Industry ==
Arak is one of industrial cities of Iran, manufacturing 80% of Iran energy equipment. The city houses Machin Sazi Arak, HEPCO , Wagon Pars, Iranian Aluminium Company, Lajvar Industrial Group and Iran Combine Manufacturing Company.

Arak has chemical, construction, energy, food, machinery, metal, mining, textile, petroleum and petrochemical Industries.

Other important industrial factories based in Arak are:

- AzarAb Industries
- Avangan
- Navard Aluminium
- Arak Petrochemical Company
- Arak Oil Refinery
- Heavy Water Production Plant of Arak
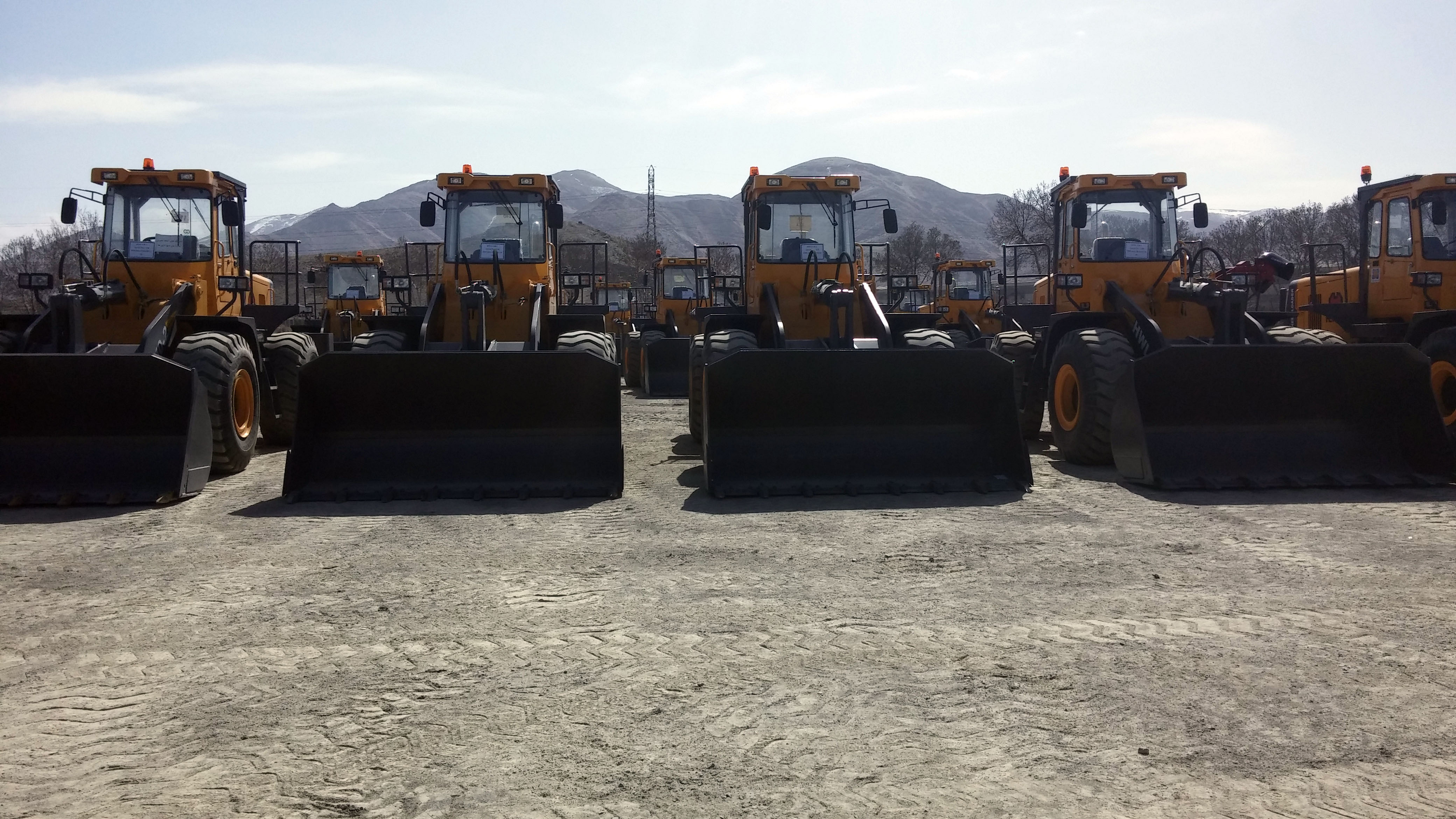
HEPCO wheel loaders

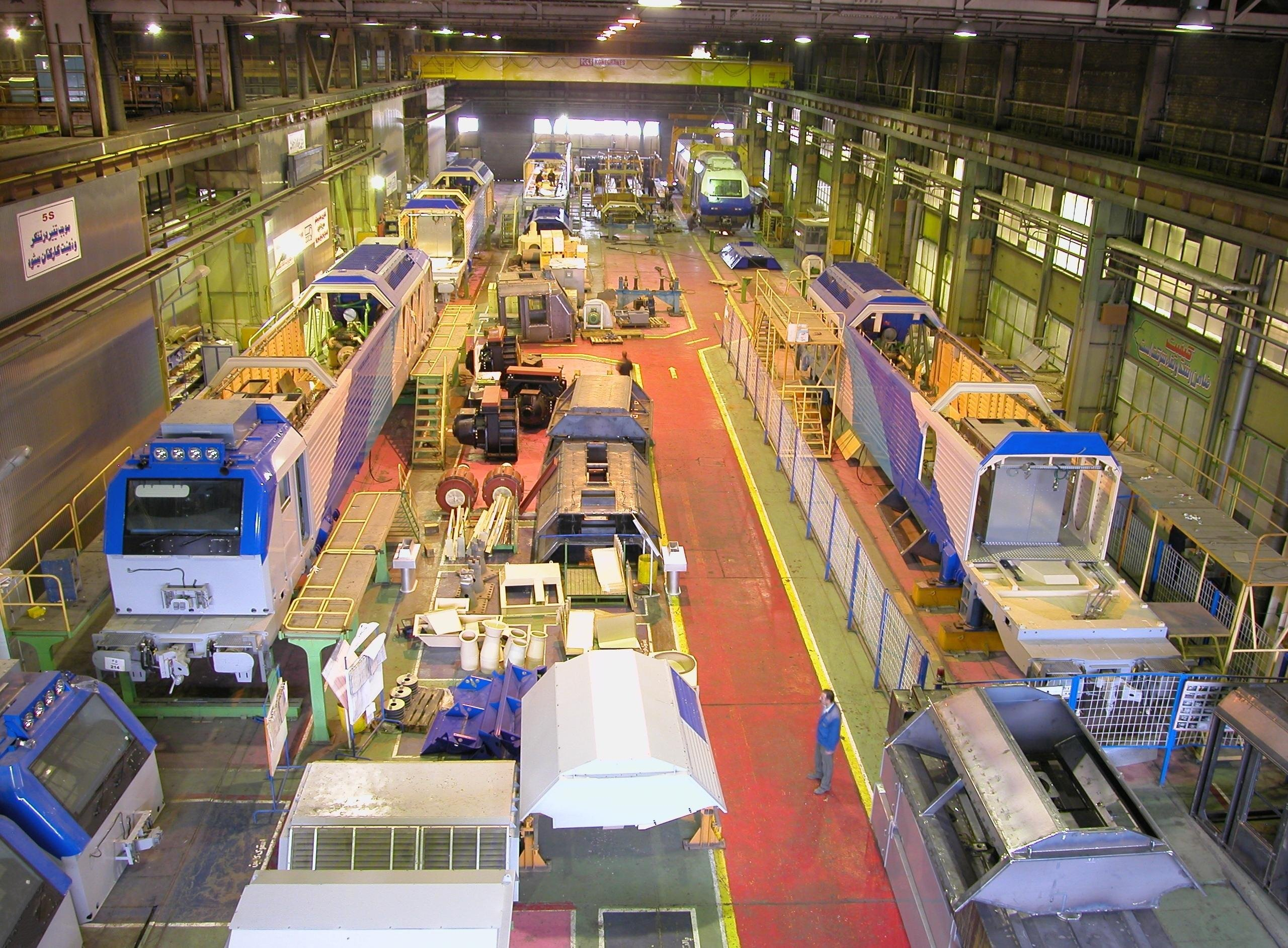
Locomotive production at Wagon Pars

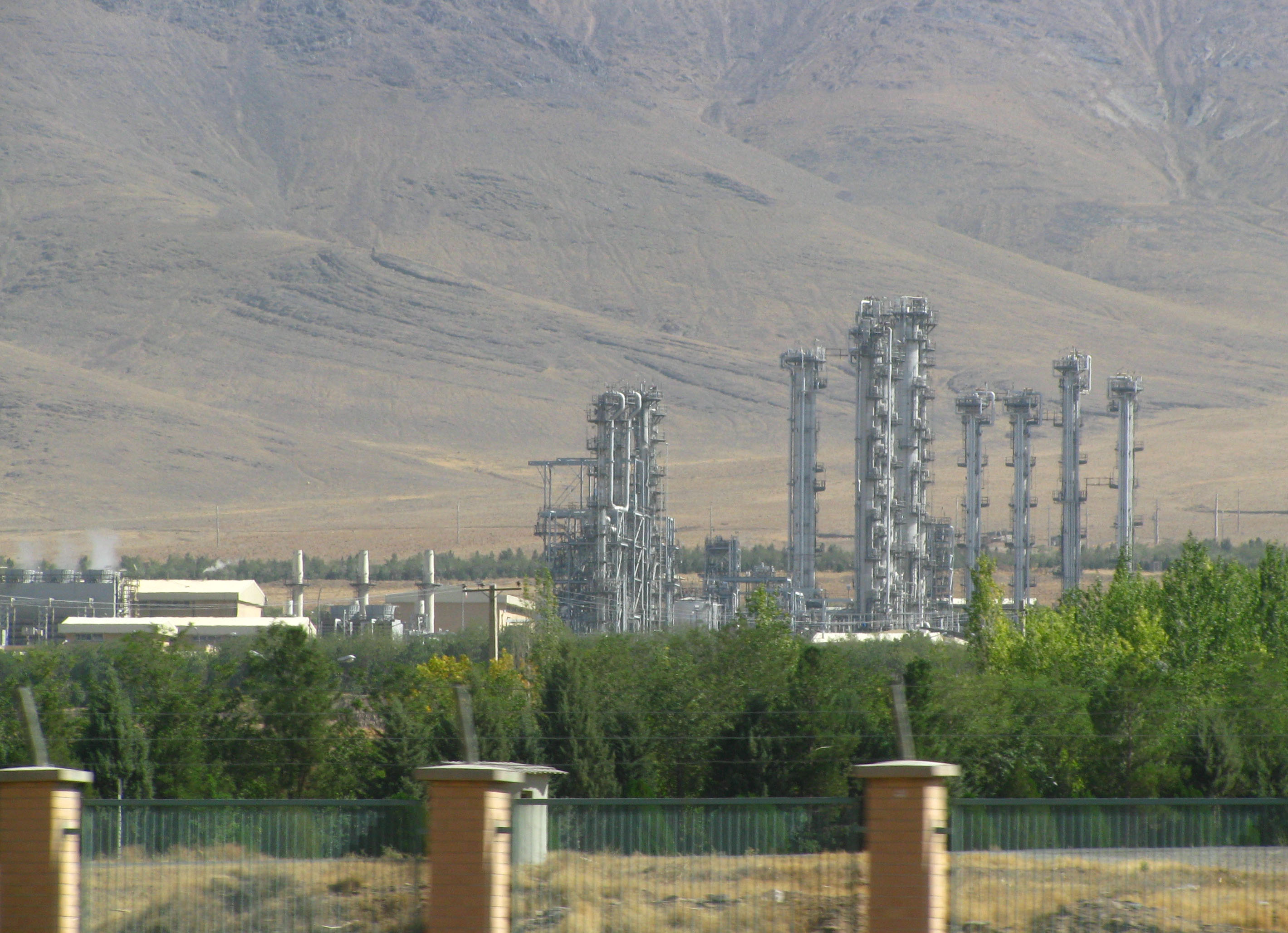
The Heavy Water Production Plant of Arak

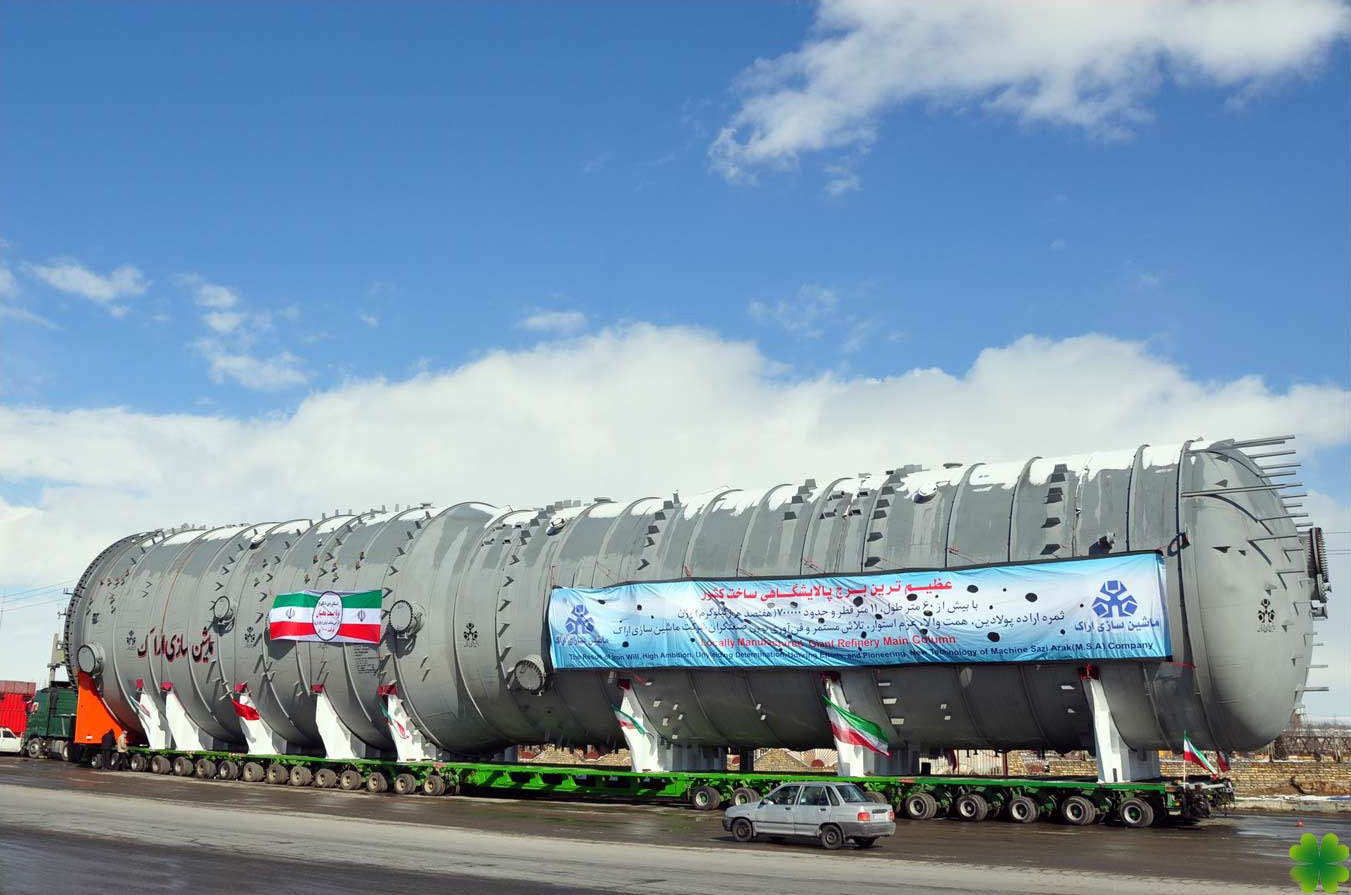
Giant Fractionating column manufactured by Machine Sazi Arak (MSA)

=== Agriculture and handicrafts ===
The main agricultural products of the city are grain, barley, grapes, apples, walnuts, and almonds. Arak also exports hand-knotted carpets which are referred to as Sarouk rugs. Saruq is a small village outside Arak.

== Main sites ==
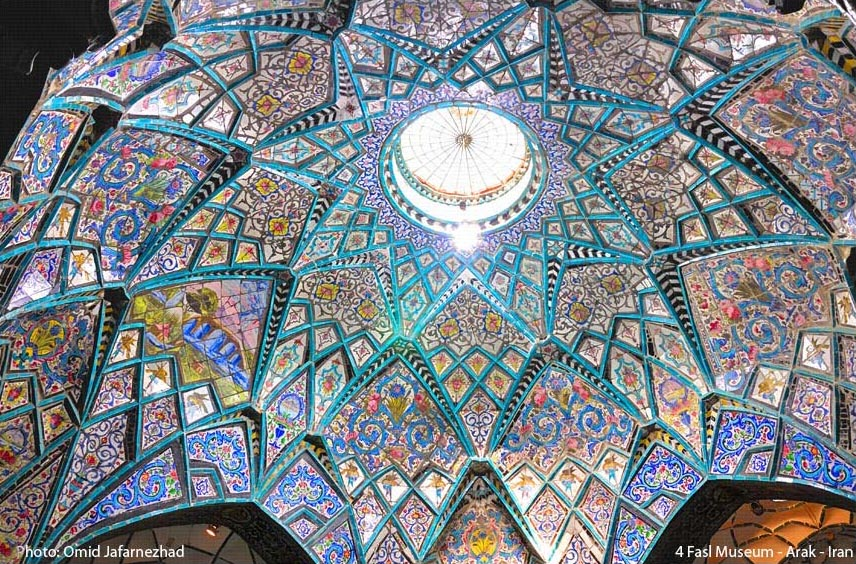
A ceiling at the Four Seasons Bathhouse

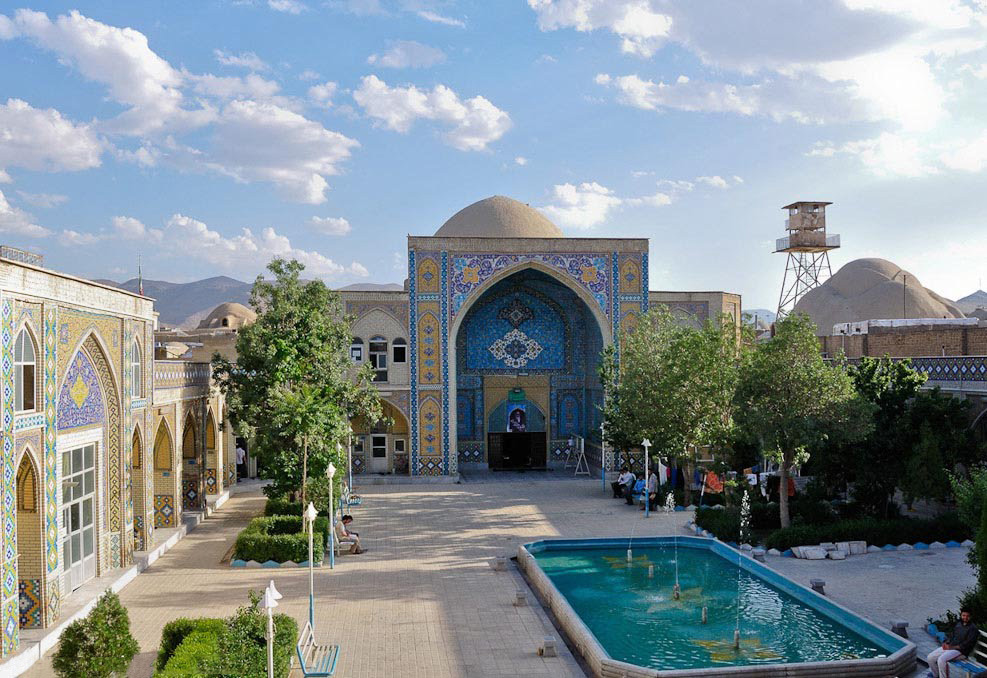
Yard of the old Sepahdar school

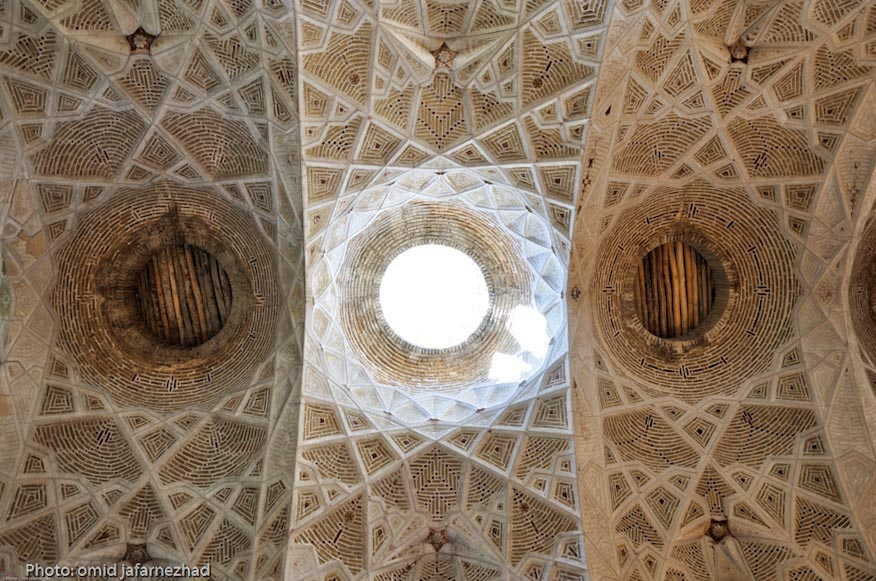
A ceiling at the old bazaar of Arak

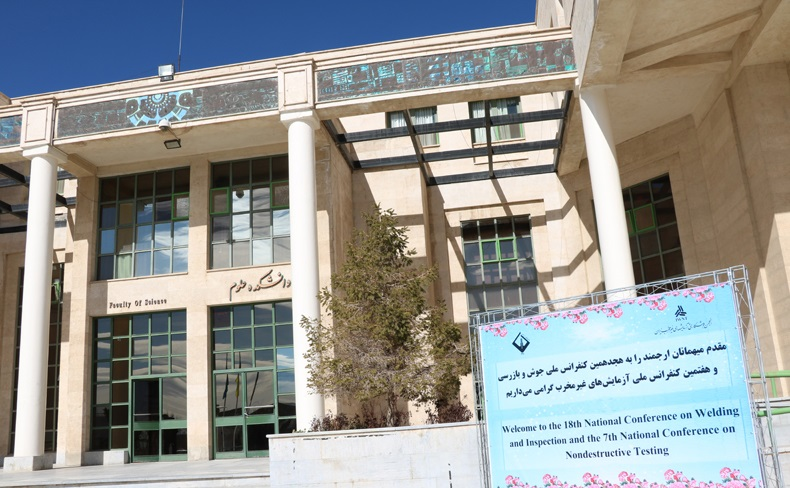
Arak University, Faculty of Science

=== Parks and gardens ===
- Nezam Lashgar Garden (Garden of Esmaeili)
- City Park
- Amir Kabir Park
- Jangali Park
- Kelale Mountain Park
- Arak Zoo
- Madar Park

=== Museums ===
- Soltan Abad Museum
- Four Seasons Bathhouse
- Museum of Artifacts (Hassan Pour Museum)
- Museum of Famous Figures (The Hall of Fame of Arak)
- Grand Museum of Arak

=== Sports complexes ===
- Amir Kabir Entertainment and Sports Complex
- Tufan Entertainment and Sports Complex
- Shahin Horse Riding Complex

=== Universities ===
- Arak University
- Arak University of Medical Sciences
- Arak University of Technology
- Azad University of Arak
- Payam-e-Noor University of Arak
- Kharazmi University of Arak

=== Other ===
- Mostowfi Mansion
- Gerdoo Valley (known for its walnut trees and ranges)

== Notable people ==
=== Statesmen and politicians ===
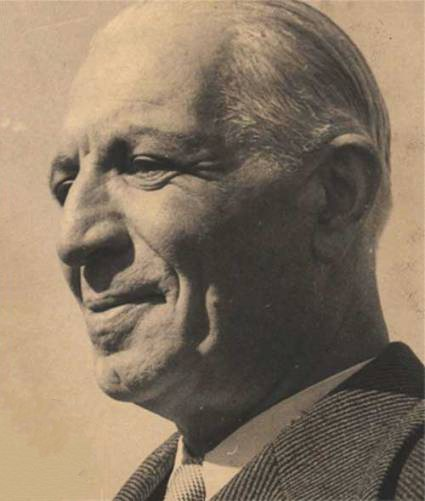
Morteza-Qoli Bayat, a former Prime Minister of Iran

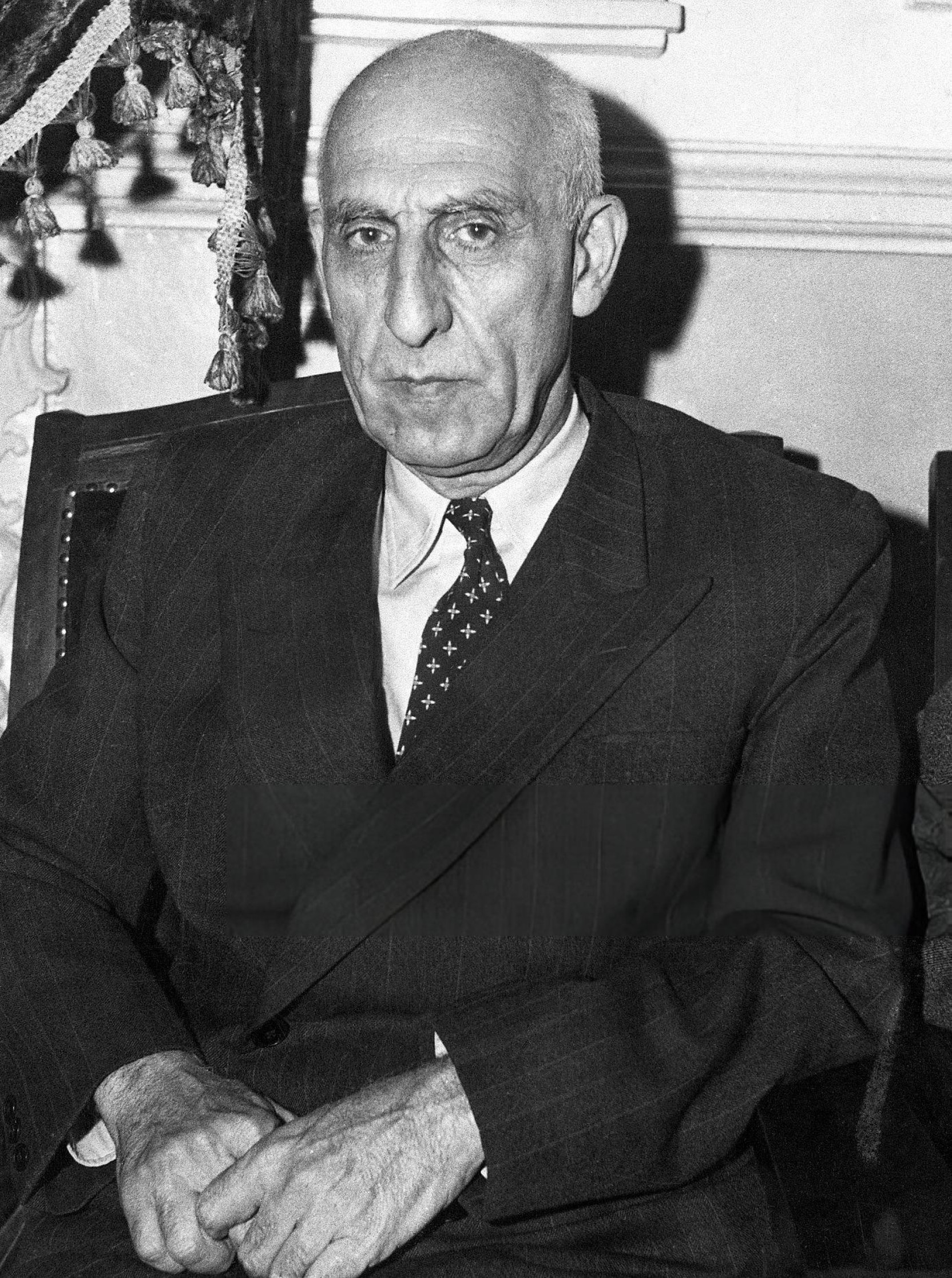
Mohammad Mosaddegh

- Sharaf Khan Bidlisi (1543–ca. 1600), Kurdish historian and prince of Bitlis, born in Karahrūd, Arak.
- Ghaem Magham Farahani (1779–1835), former Prime Minister of Iran, born in Farahan District, Arak.
- Amir Kabir (1807–1852), former Prime Minister of Iran, born in Hezaveh District, Arak.
- Mohammad Mosaddegh (1882–1967), former Prime Minister of Iran, born in Tehran. His father was from Ashtiyan, northeastern Arak.
- Morteza-Qoli Bayat (1890–1958), former Prime Minister of Iran (1944–1945).
- Ata'ollah Mohajerani (1954–), one of the ministers of the cabinet of Mohammad Khatami.
- Roozbeh Farahanipour (1971–), Iranian-American former opposition leader, co founder of Glorious Frontiers Party, one of leaders 9 July 1999 Student uprising.

=== Literary, painting, and photography figures ===
- Kader Abdolah (1954–), Iranian-Dutch poet laureate
- Zhaleh Alamtaj (1883–1947), feminist poet
- Sonia Balassanian (born 1942), Iranian-born Armenian painter, curator, sculptor
- Parvin E'tesami (1907–1941), poet, was born in Tabriz. Her father was from Ashtiyan, northeastern Arak.\
- Behjat Sadr (1924–2009), painter, moved to France

=== Sportsmen ===
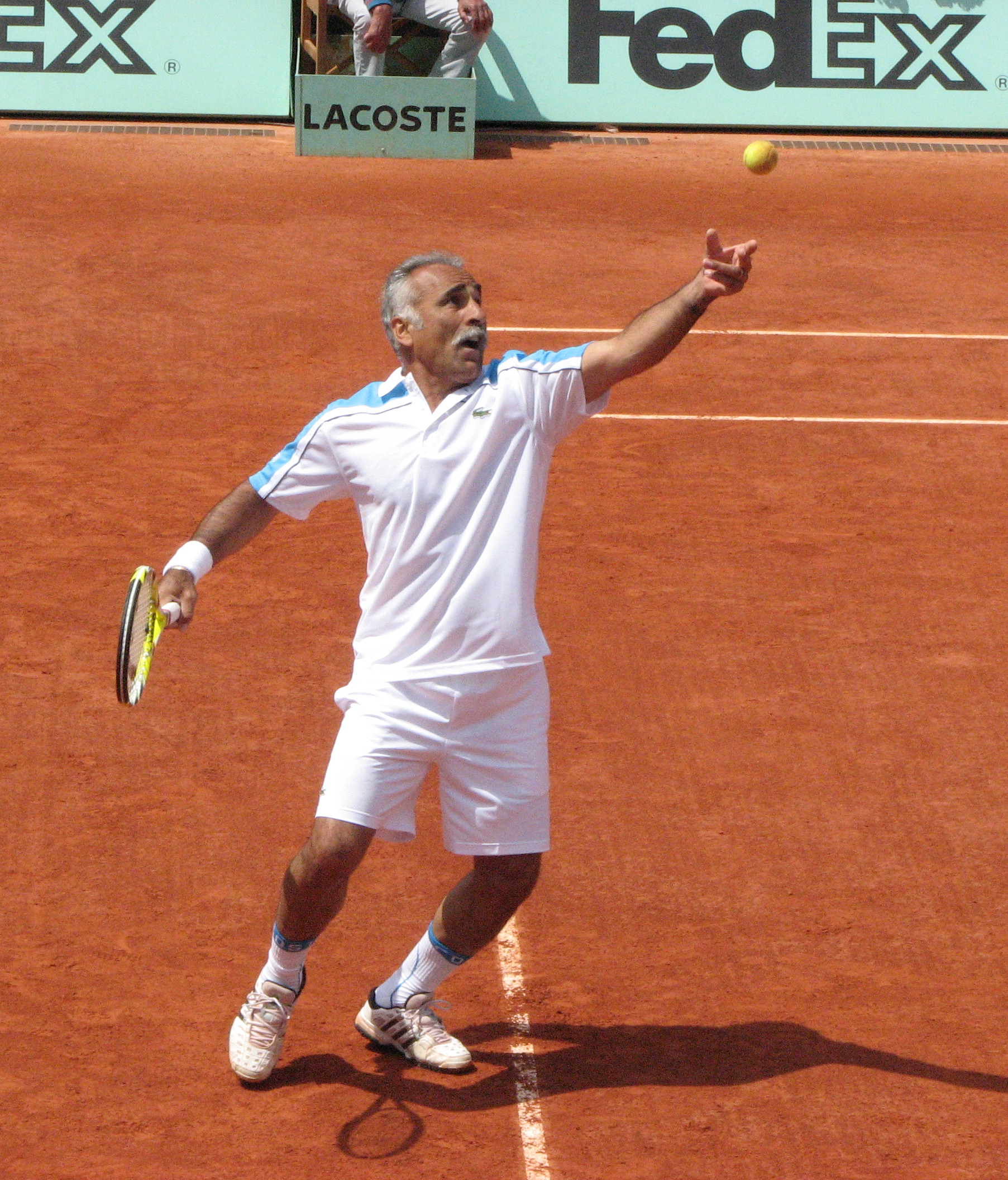
Mansour Bahrami

- Mansour Bahrami (1956–), Iranian-French tennis player
- Mehdi Mahdavikia (1977–), football player

=== Scientists ===
- Mohammad Gharib (1909–1975), physician and clinician
- Wahid Shams Kolahi (1965–), electrical engineer

=== Singers ===
- Ebrahim Hamedi (Ebi) (1949–), singer; his father was from Arak.

=== Cinema and television artists ===
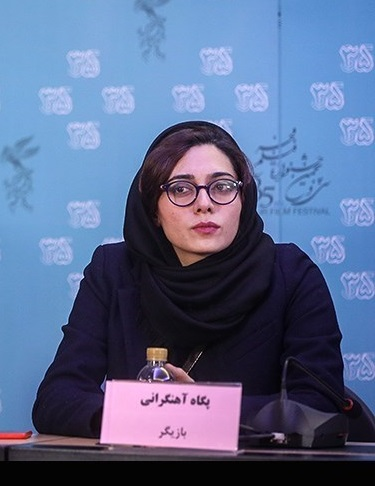
Pegah Ahangarani

- Yervand Manaryan (1924–2020), Iranian-Armenian actor
- Arman Manaryan (1929–2016), Iranian-born Armenian film director
- Reza Badiyi (1930–2011), Iranian-born American director of episodes of many popular American television series, including Hawaii Five-O, Mission: Impossible, The Incredible Hulk, The Six Million Dollar Man, Falcon Crest, Buffy the Vampire Slayer (the episode Out of Mind, Out of Sight), Nikita, etc.
- Pouri Banayi, (1940–), actress before the 1979 Revolution (1965–1979)
- Golchehreh Sajadiye (1954–), actress
- Manijeh Hekmat (1962–), film director
- Mostafa Azizi (1962–), TV producer
- Mehran Modiri (1967–), actor, director and comedian; his parents were from Arak.
- Bahareh Rahnama (1973–), actress
- Sahar Zakaria (1973–), actress
- Pegah Ahangarani (1984–), actress and filmmaker, lives in the United Kingdom

=== Other ===
- Azadeh Bokaie Dadgar (1980–), journalist, lawyer and activist

== See also ==
- List of cities in Iran
- List of cities, towns and villages in Markazi Province
- Sultanabad rugs and carpets
- Sultanabad ware – Medieval Persian pottery

Arak travel guide from Wikivoyage

- Media related to Arak at Wikimedia Commons
