= Pile weave =

Class of fabrics with a surface extending outward from the base weave

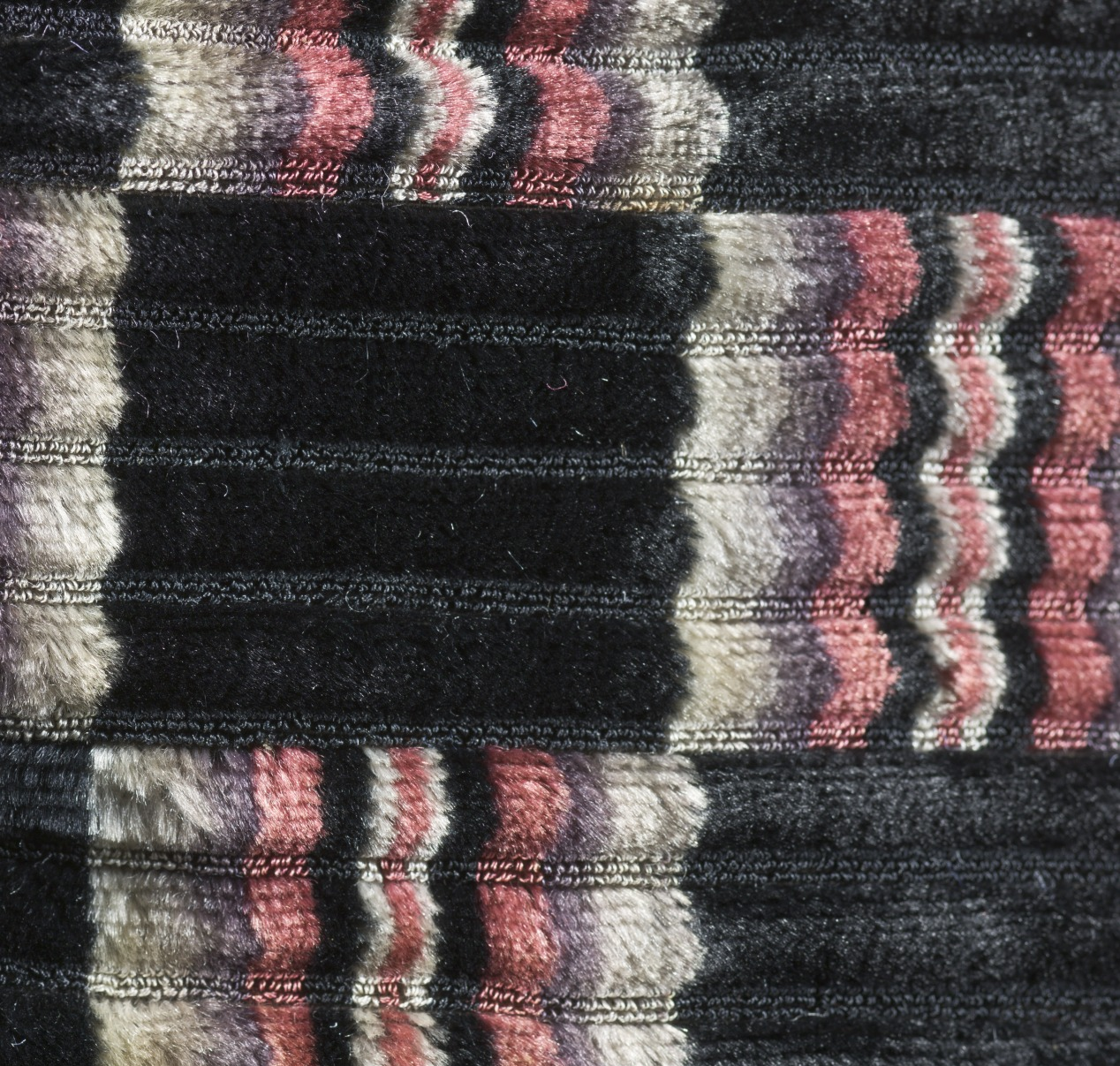
Pile weave: a cut and uncut velvet used for a man's vest, ca. 1845, LACMA M.2007.211.819

Pile weave is a form of textile created by weaving. This type of fabric is characterized by a pile—a looped or tufted surface that extends above the initial foundation, or 'ground' weave. The pile is formed by supplemental yarn running in the direction of the length of the fabric (warp pile weave) or the width of the fabric (weft or filling pile weave). Pile weaves include velvet and corduroy fabrics and machine-woven Berber carpets.

== Hand-woven pile ==
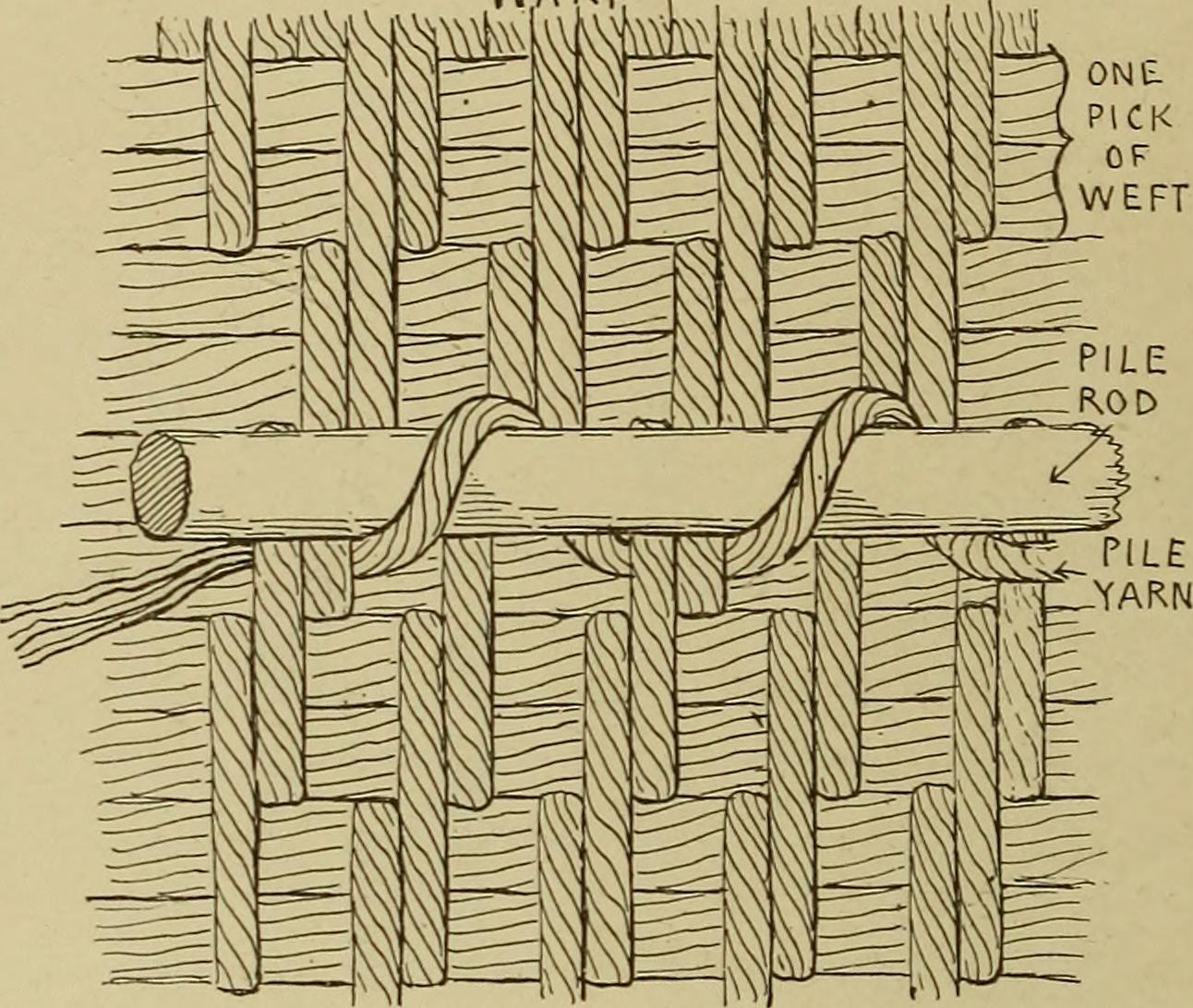
One method of making a weft pile on a hand loom.

Pile fabrics were originally made on traditional hand looms. The warp ends that are used for the formation of the pile are woven over metal rods or wires that are inserted in the shed (gap caused by raising alternate threads) during weaving. This same effect can be achieved by winding the pile yarn around a rod during weaving. In both methods, the pile yarns lie in loops over the inserted rods and when a rod is extracted, the pile yarns remain as loops on top of the base fabric. The pile ends lying over the rod may be left as 'loop pile', or cut to form 'cut pile' or velvet.

== Machine-woven pile ==
Face-to-face method of weaving. A knife cuts through the middle during weaving to produce two layers of velvet cloth.

On power looms the technology of 'wire weaving' still exists, using modern technology and electronics. This weaving technique allows users to obtain both loop pile and cut pile in the same fabric. Other techniques involve the weaving of two layers of fabric on top of each other, whereby the warp ends used for the pile are inserted in such a way that they form a vertical connection between the two layers of fabric. By cutting the pile ends in between the two layers one obtains two separate pile fabrics. With this technique only the cut pile effect can be obtained. This is known as 'face-to-face weaving'. Both 'wire weaving' and 'face-to-face' weaving are used for the manufacturing of upholstery and furnishing fabrics as well as in rug making.

== Knotted pile ==
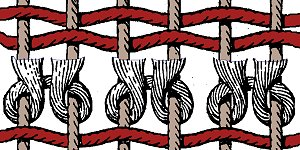
Knotted pile.

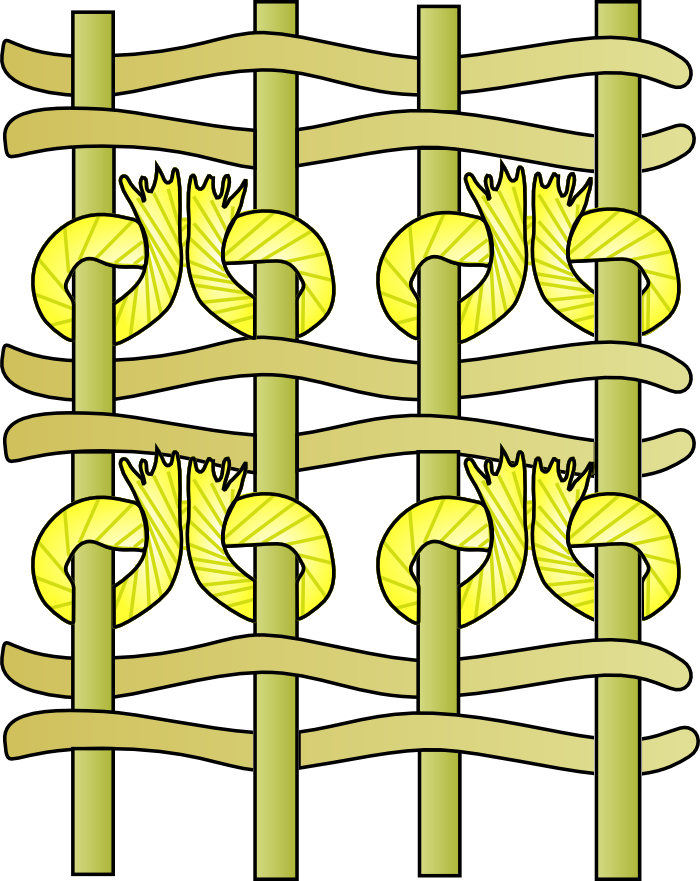
Ghiordes knot

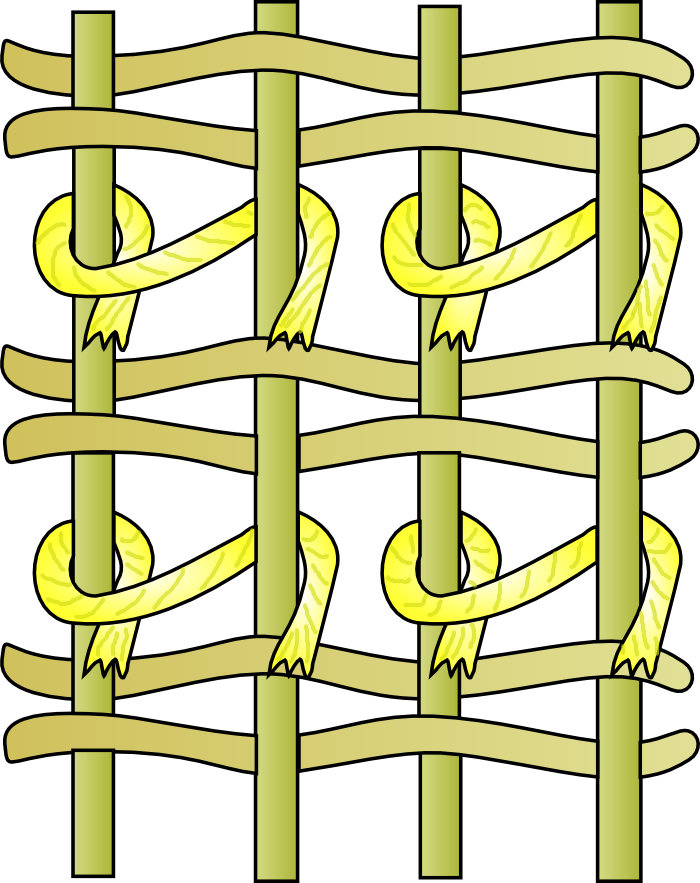
Senneh knot

The yellow yarn is the pile, the vertical the warp, and the horizontal the weft

Knotted pile or knotted weave is the method of weaving used in most rugs. In this technique the rug is woven by creation of knots. A short piece of yarn is tied by hand around two neighboring warp strands creating a knot on the surface of the rug. After each row of knots is created, one or more strands of weft are passed through a complete set of warp strands. Then the knots and the weft strands are beaten with a comb securing the knots in place. A rug can consist of 25 to over 1,000 knots per square inch.

== Fabrics ==
=== Warp pile weave ===
- Velvet, a pile weave made of filament fiber with the pile yarn in the lengthwise or warp direction.
- Frieze
- Terrycloth, a pile fabric (usually cotton) with uncut loops on both sides. The pile in terrycloth is formed by a special weaving arrangement in which three picks or fillings are inserted and beaten up with one motion of the reed. Common varieties include two-pick and three-pick terries with three-pick one being the highest quality, it has two picks under the pile loop and one pick between loops. Each loop acts as a tiny sponge.
  Terrycloth's large absorption capacity makes it the fabric of choice for bath towels and bath robes.

=== Filling or weft pile weave ===
- Corduroy, a textile composed of twisted fibers that, when woven, lie parallel (similar to twill) to one another to form the cloth's distinct pattern, a "cord." Modern corduroy is most commonly composed of tufted cords, sometimes exhibiting a channel (bare to the base fabric) between the tufts. Corduroy is, in essence, a ridged form of velvet.
- Velveteen, made of staple fibers (often cotton) with the pile yarn in filling (cross-wise) direction.

== See also ==
- Textile manufacturing terminology
