= Gereh =

Gereh (Persian: "knot") may refer to:

- a unit of measurement used in calculating knot density, approx. 2.75 inches
- Girih, a Persianate Islamic decorative art form
