= Velour =

Knitted fabric or textile resembling velvet

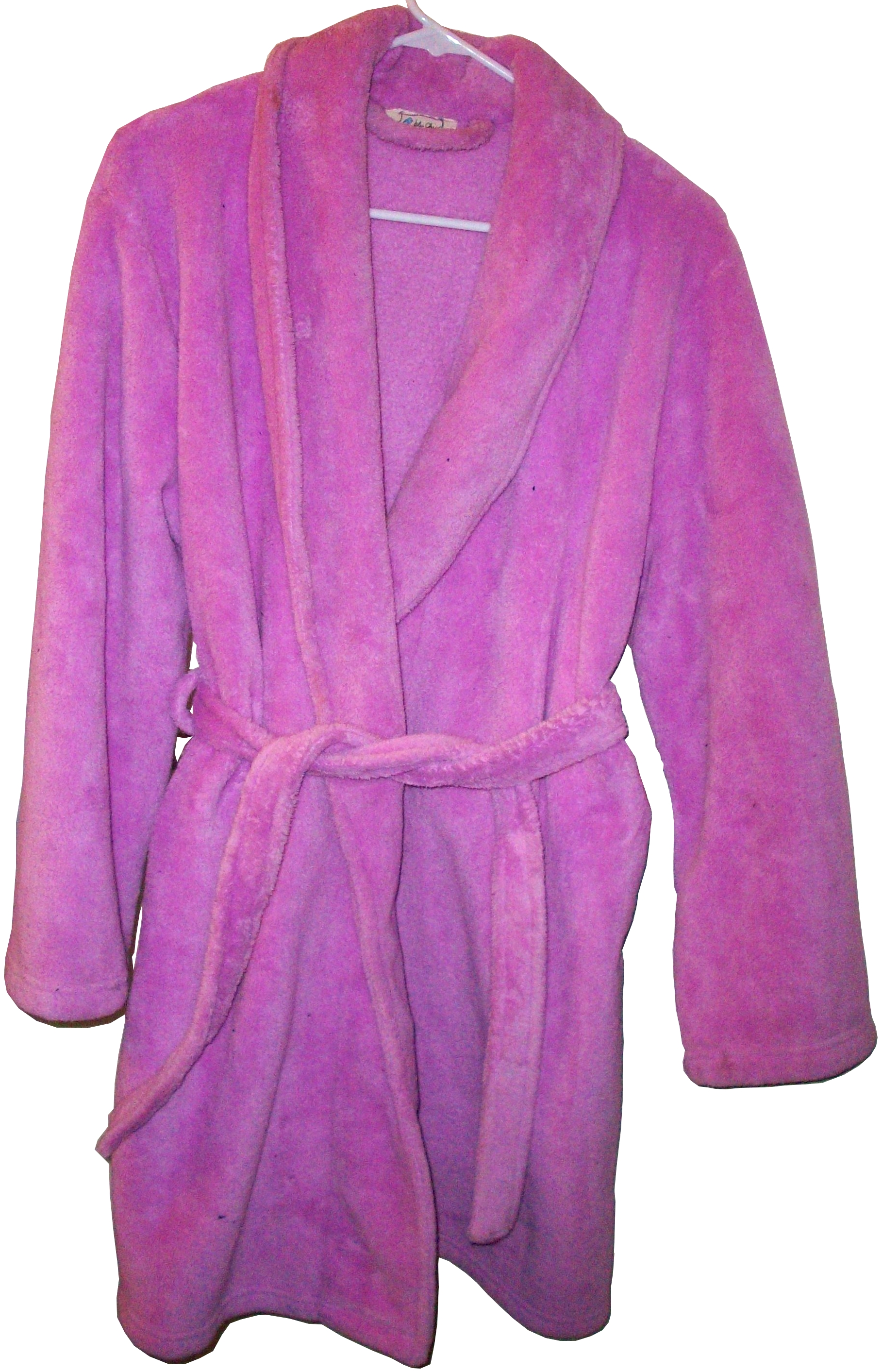
A pink velour bathrobe made of 100% polyester

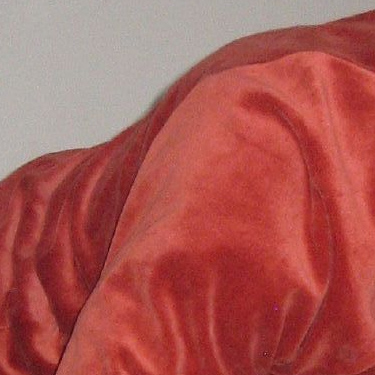
A piece of velour fabric

Velour, occasionally velours, is a plush, knitted fabric or textile similar to velvet or velveteen. It can be made from polyester, spandex, cotton, or a cotton-polyester blend. Velour is used in a wide variety of applications, including clothing and upholstery. Velour typically has a medium-length pile, shorter than velvet but longer than velveteen.

== History and uses ==
Velour originated in France, although it is unclear who first created it. There is a 1591 entry in the accounts of Nathaniel Bacon of Stiffkey, Norfolk, England, "for half a yard of vellewre to make pomelles for the sydsaddelles" for 2 shillings' cost. (Note this is in distinction to velvet ("vellet") found elsewhere in the accounts).

Velour is a knitted fabric, which makes it stretchy (unlike velvet and velveteen, which are woven). Velour is soft, allows freedom of movement, and is used for activewear and loungewear. Historically, velour was cheaper than velvet and was thus often used for home furnishings and decor which would take heavy wear and tear. However, modern manufacturing techniques make velvet affordable for home furnishings. The low cost of velour allows for its use by people of all economic classes.

In the 1970s, velour gained popularity through clothing trends such as athleisure tracksuits.

== See also ==
- Velveteen
- Duvetyne
- Rep (fabric)
