= Varamin carpet =

Type of Persian carpet

Varamin carpets and rugs or Veramin carpets and rugs (Persian: قالی و فرش ورامین) are carpets and rugs woven in city of Varamin and its surrounding area, southeast of Tehran. Many rug and carpet experts see Varamins as being among those Persian carpets most authentic in terms of traditional style and motif.

== Technique and knot ==
The foundation is mostly made of cotton, the Persian Senneh knot is used for these rugs as opposed to the more widespread Turkish knot. Varamin is considered being among the elite of Persian carpets. Varamins are made by tribal people who either live in or pass by Varamin. These rugs are usually woven in vertical loom. The principal colours used in Varamin carpets are usually dark brown and dark red on khaki or dark blue backgrounds. The village and workshop weavers mainly use the asymmetrical (Persian) knot, while the nomads, depending on their ethnicity, use either the asymmetrical or the symmetrical (Turkish) knot.

== Design ==
Varamin carpets characteristically have a light background color such as ivory, light blue, light green, or gold. This color choice distinguishes Varamin weavings from those produced in cities such as Kashan. Traditional red and blue hues were also used for the field. These colors are interchangeable for the border as well. The most common design among Varamin rugs is the "Mina Khani" which is a motif composed of four round daisy-like flowers in the shape of a diamond and attached to each other by a smaller flower, repeated all over the field. Mina Khani's etymology is unknown but Mina is a feminine name. Mina Khani seems to be also related to Herati motif which is more common in eastern Iran. Other popular motifs include Zil-i-soltan, which is the classic vase-of-flowers and is one of the most frequent motifs on all Persian carpets; and Plants and animal motifs which includes intricate floral designs with animal figures scattered in between.

== Gallery ==
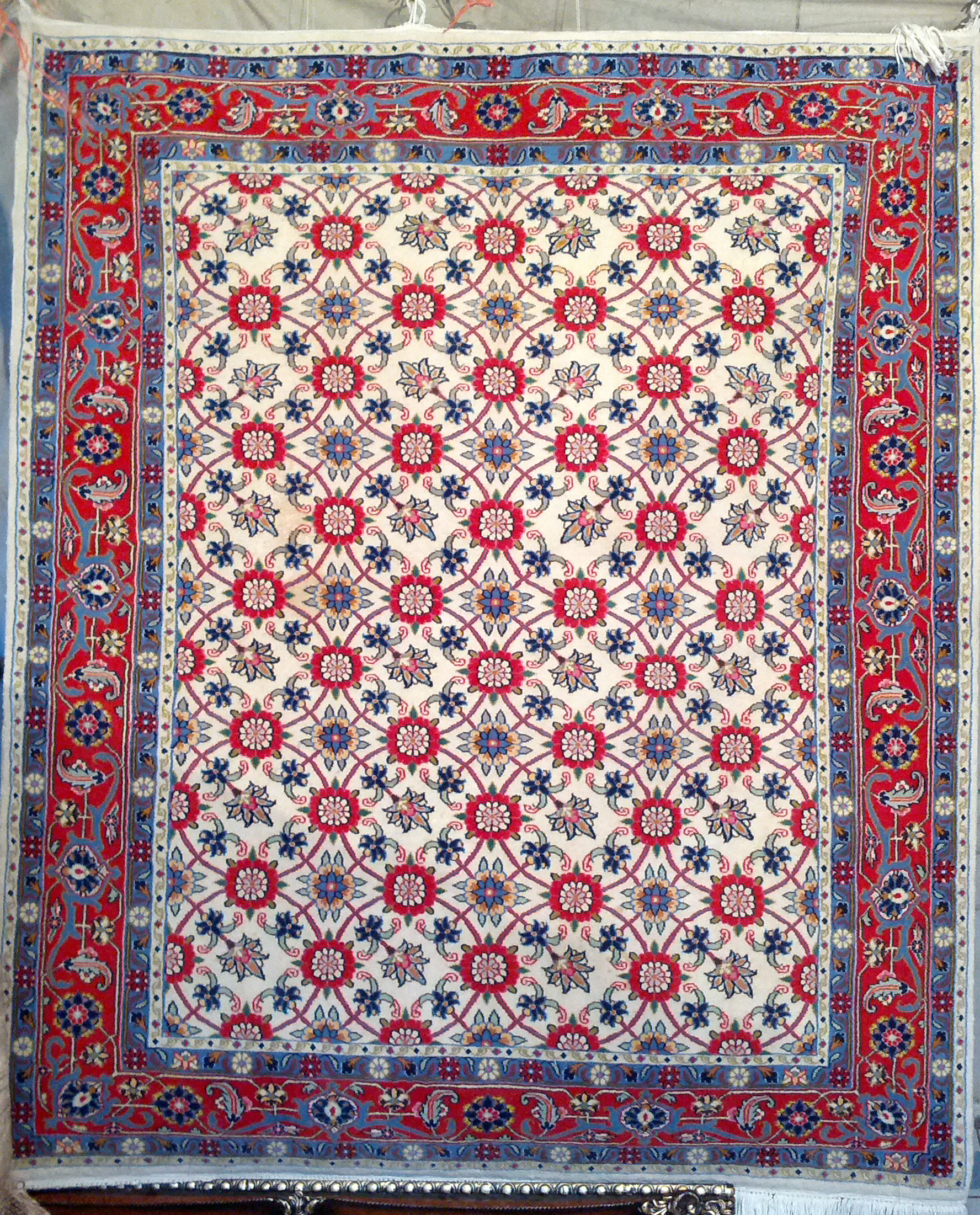
A carpet with Minakhani motif

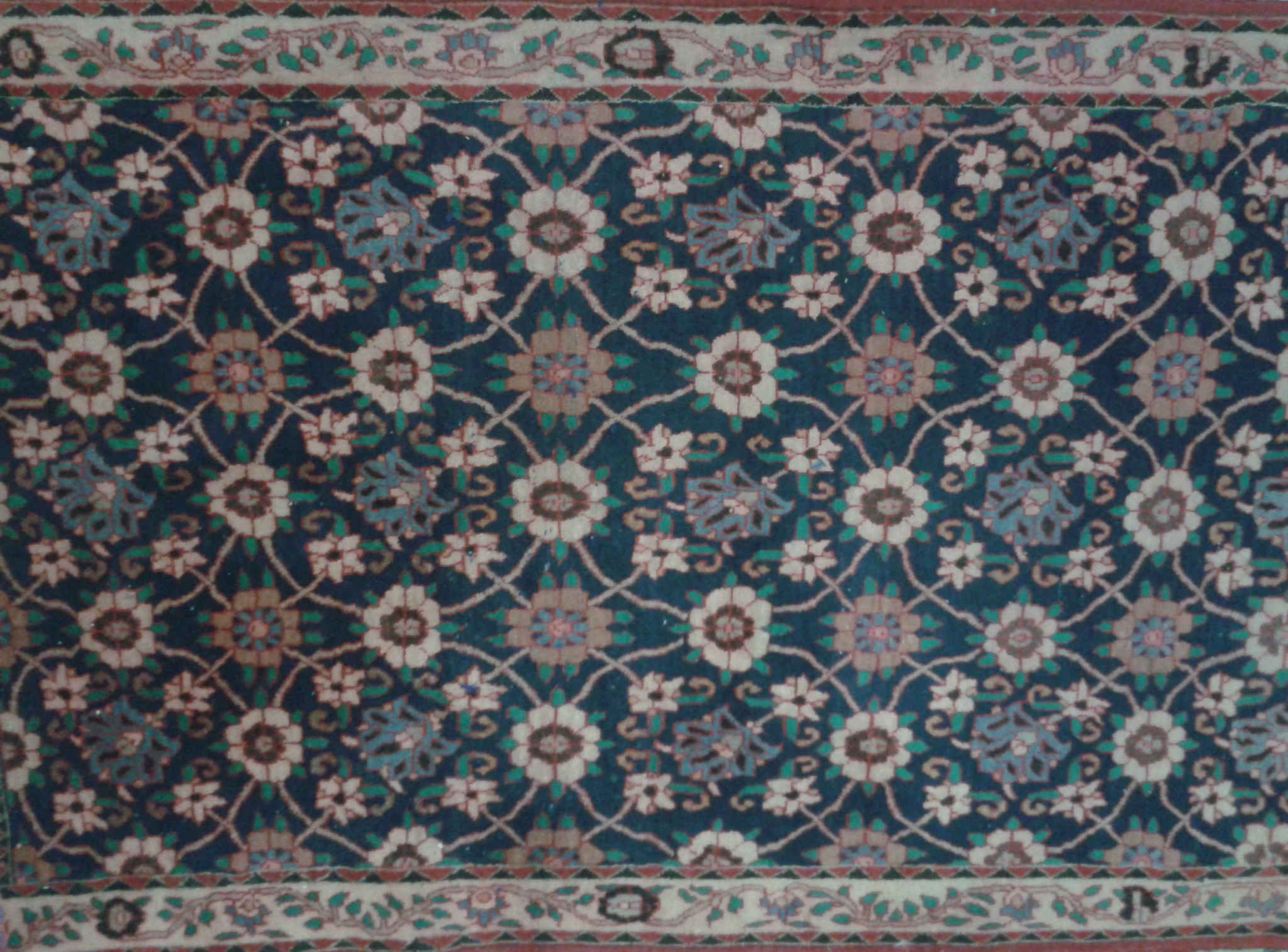
A carpet with Minakhani motif

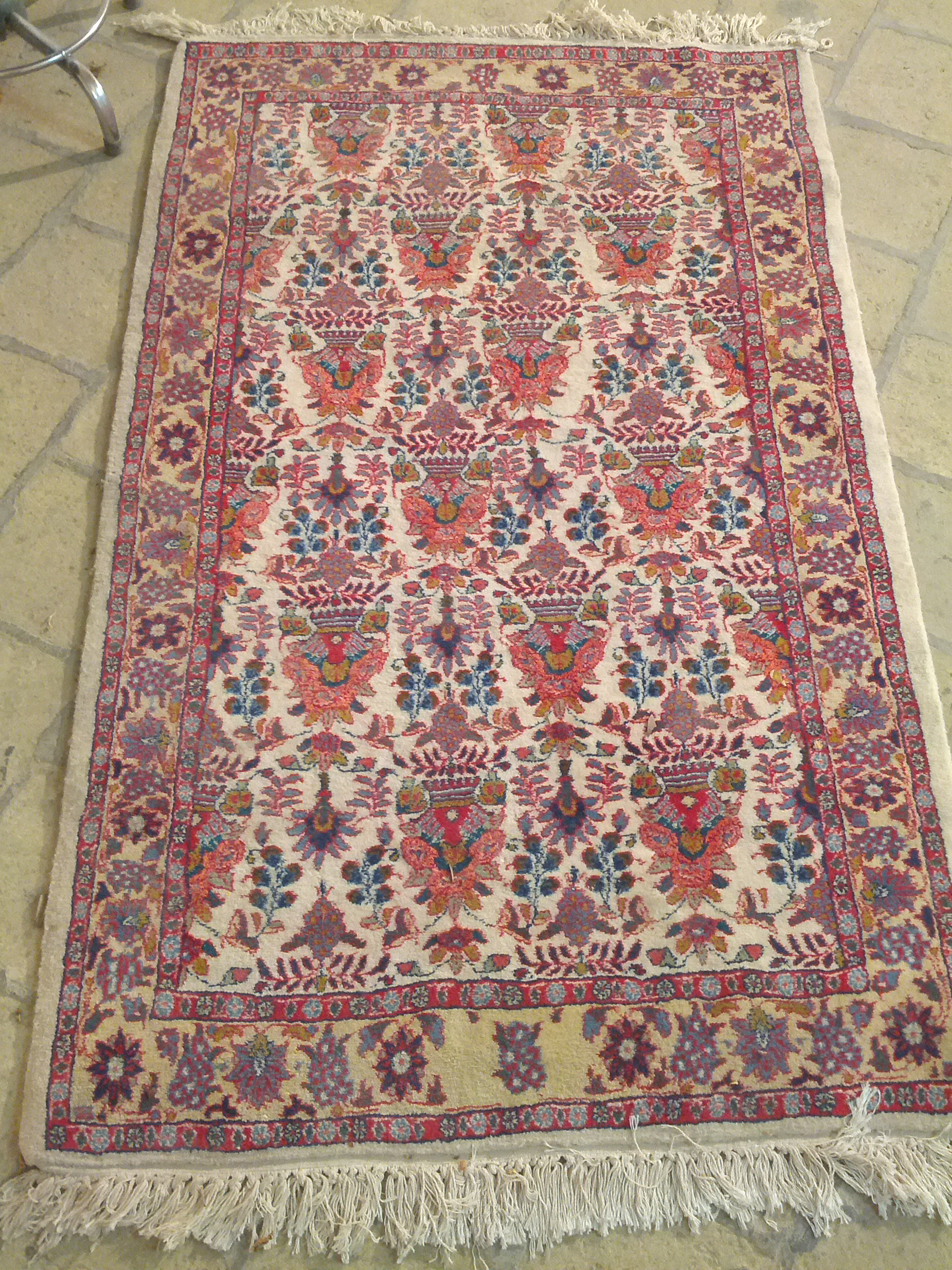
A carpet with Zell ol Soltan motif

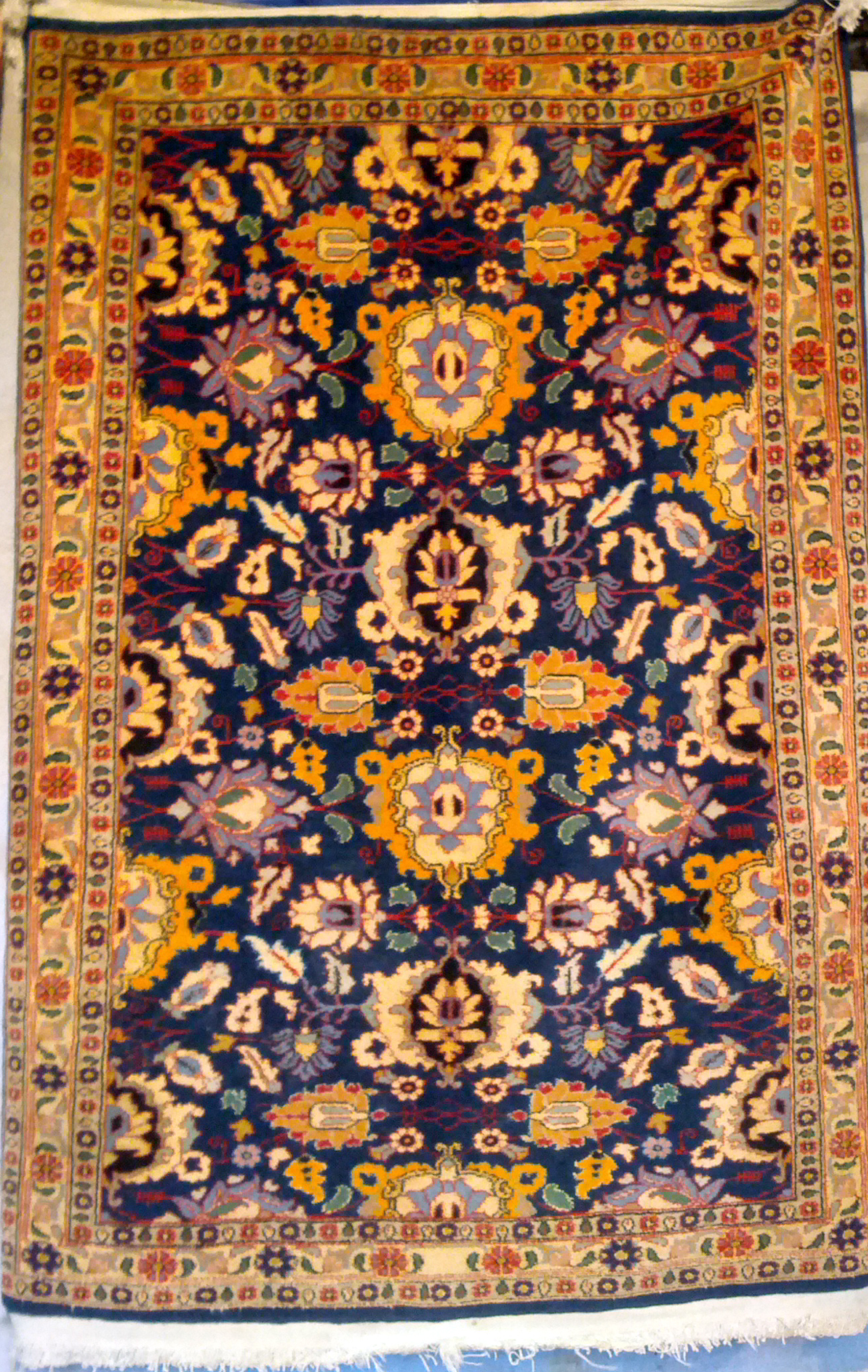
A carpet with Pashotori motif
