= KPSD =

KPSD may refer to:

- KPSD-FM, a radio station (97.1 FM) licensed to Faith, South Dakota, United States
- KPSD-TV, a television station (channel 25) licensed to Eagle Butte, South Dakota, United States
- KRLD-FM, a radio station that held the call letters KPSD from ? to ? licensed to Dallas, Texas, United States
- Knots per square decimeter
