= Turquerie =

Fashion in 16th to 18th century Europe

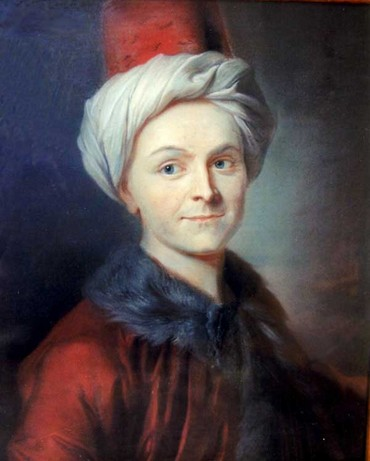
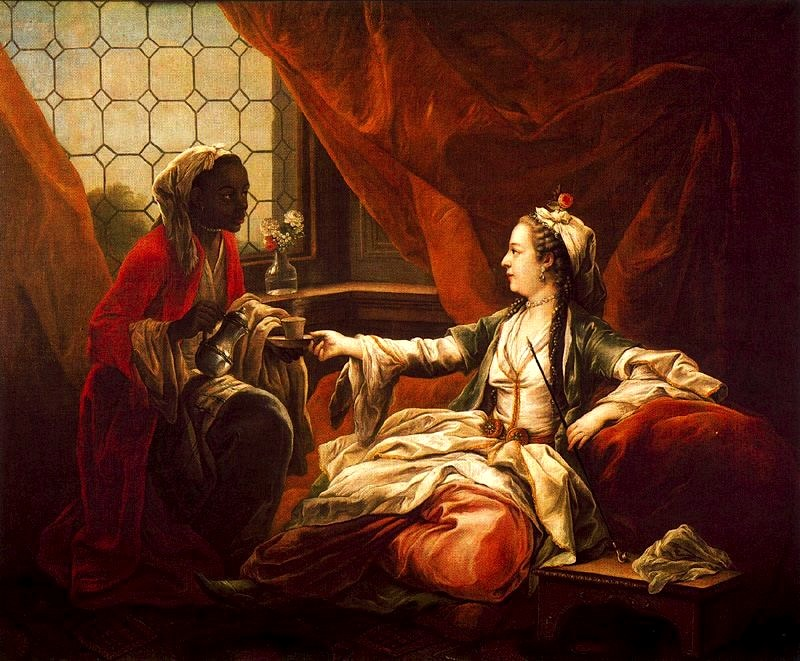
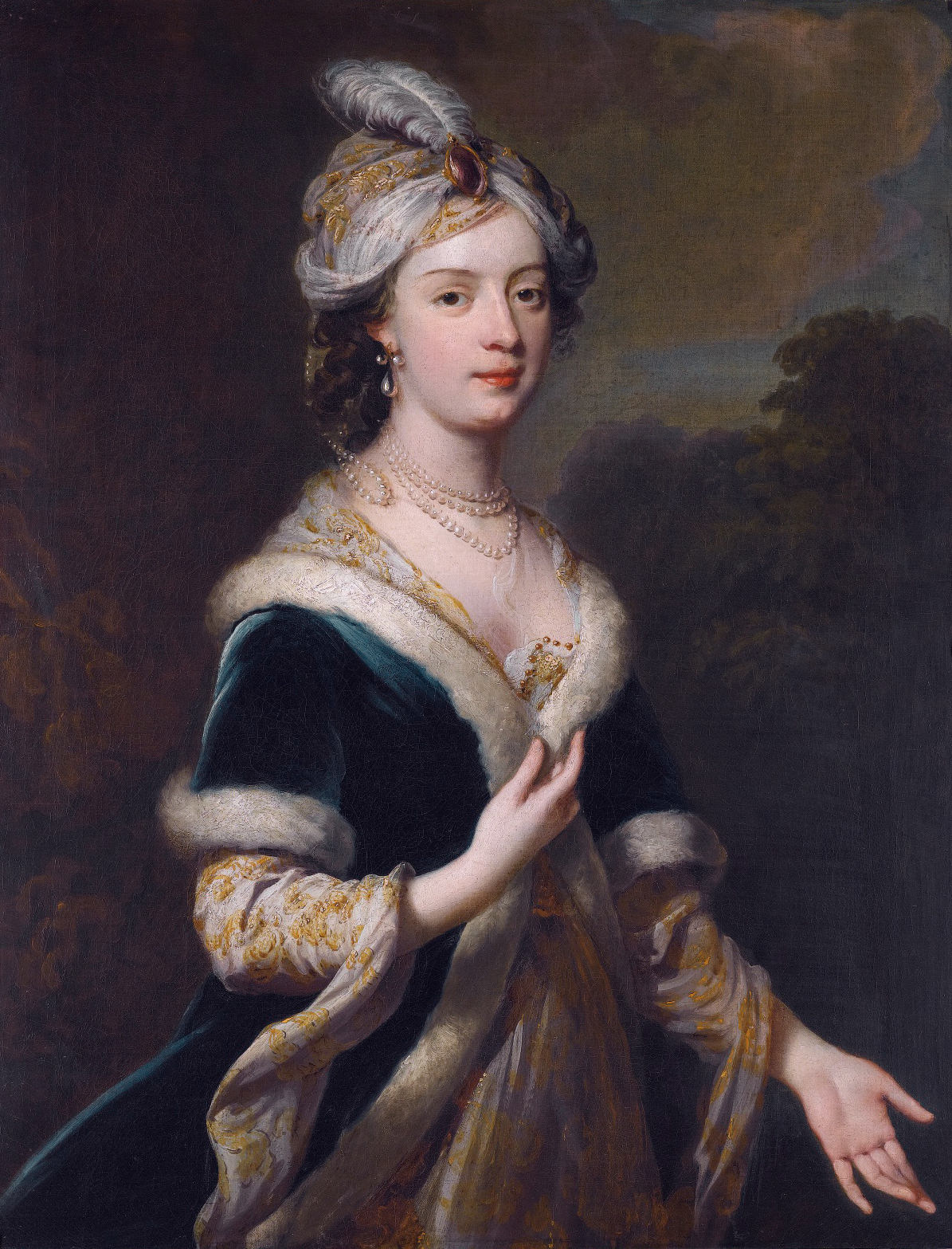
- Top to bottom: Portrait of an unknown man wearing Turkish costume by an unidentified painter; Madame de Pompadour portrayed as a Turkish lady in 1747 by Charles-André van Loo; and Elizabeth Howard, eldest daughter of Charles Howard, 3rd Earl of Carlisle in Turkish costume by George Knapton
- Years active: c. 1517–1920s
- Location: Ottoman Empire

Turquerie (anglicized as "Turkery"), or Turquoiserie, was the Turkish fashion in Western Europe from the 16th to 18th centuries for imitating aspects of Ottoman art and culture. Many different Western European countries were fascinated by the exotic and relatively unknown culture of the Ottoman ruling class, which was the center of the Ottoman Empire. This fashionable phenomenon became more popular through trading routes and increased diplomatic relationships between the Ottomans and the European nations, exemplified by the Franco-Ottoman alliance in 1536 and renewed several times, most notably in 1715. Ambassadors and traders often returned home with tales of exotic places and souvenirs of their adventures.

The movement was often reflected in the art of the period. Music, paintings, architecture, and artifacts were frequently inspired by the Ottoman styles and methods. Paintings in particular portrayed the Ottomans with bright colours and sharp contrasts, suggesting their interesting peculiarity and exotic nature.

== History of the movement ==
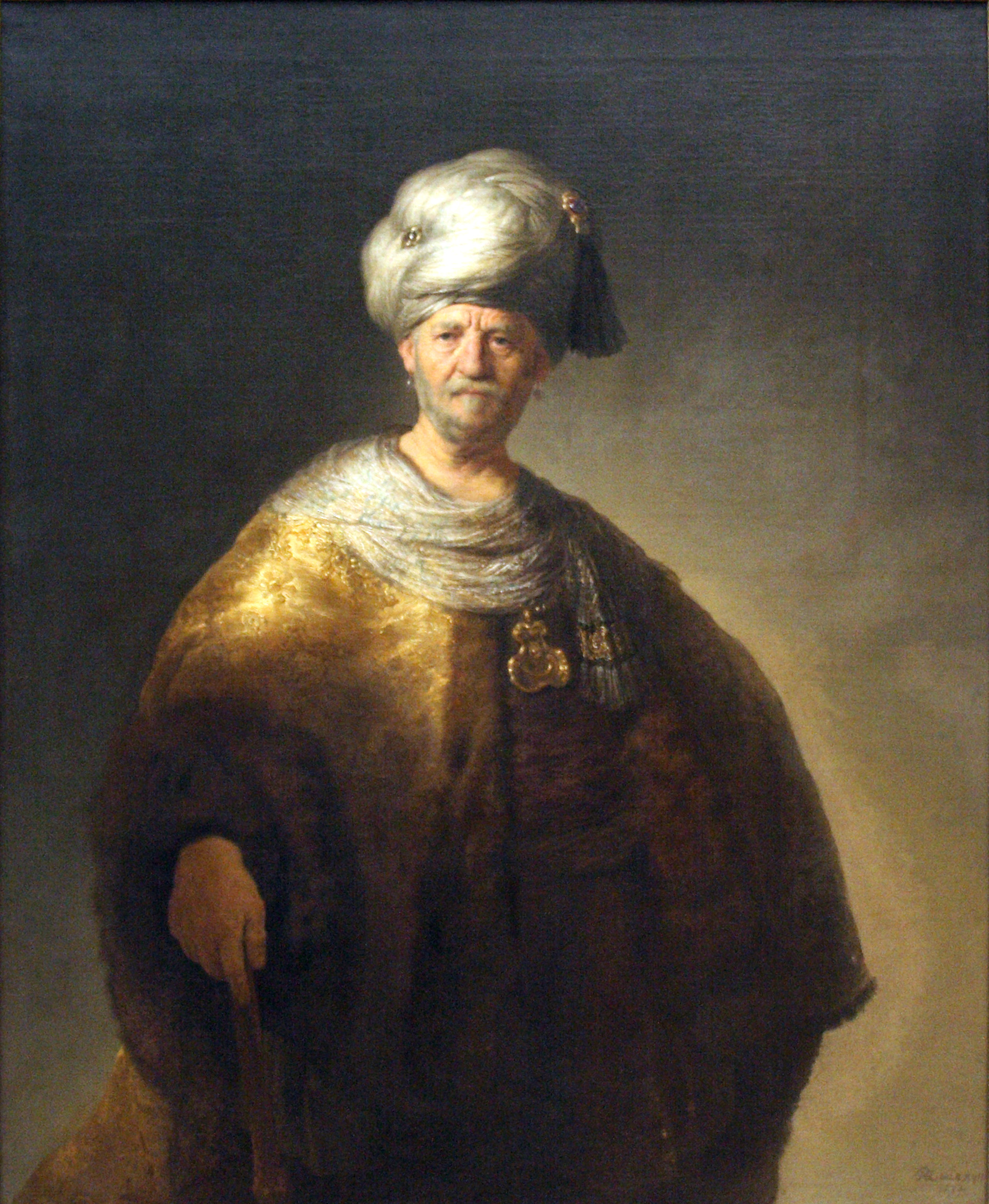
Man In Oriental Costume ("The Noble Slav"), oil on canvas, by Rembrandt, 1632. A significant example of European emulation of Ottoman dress for the purpose of portraying a dignified, elite appearance.

In the wake of the Age of Exploration, roughly between the 15th and 18th centuries, there was an explosion in the number of commodities and availability of products. People were using newly created cartography and using these maps to explore the world on paper. There was an accumulation of more objects and a desire for more acquisitions. Coupling this, there was the value of exoticism, valuing things that came from a great distance. Europeans and Ottomans alike were developing a consciousness of themselves in relation to the broader world. At the same time the Ottomans were slowly ceasing to be regarded as a serious military threat to Western Europe, despite their continuing occupation of the Balkans, and campaigns such as that ended by the Battle of Vienna as late as 1683.

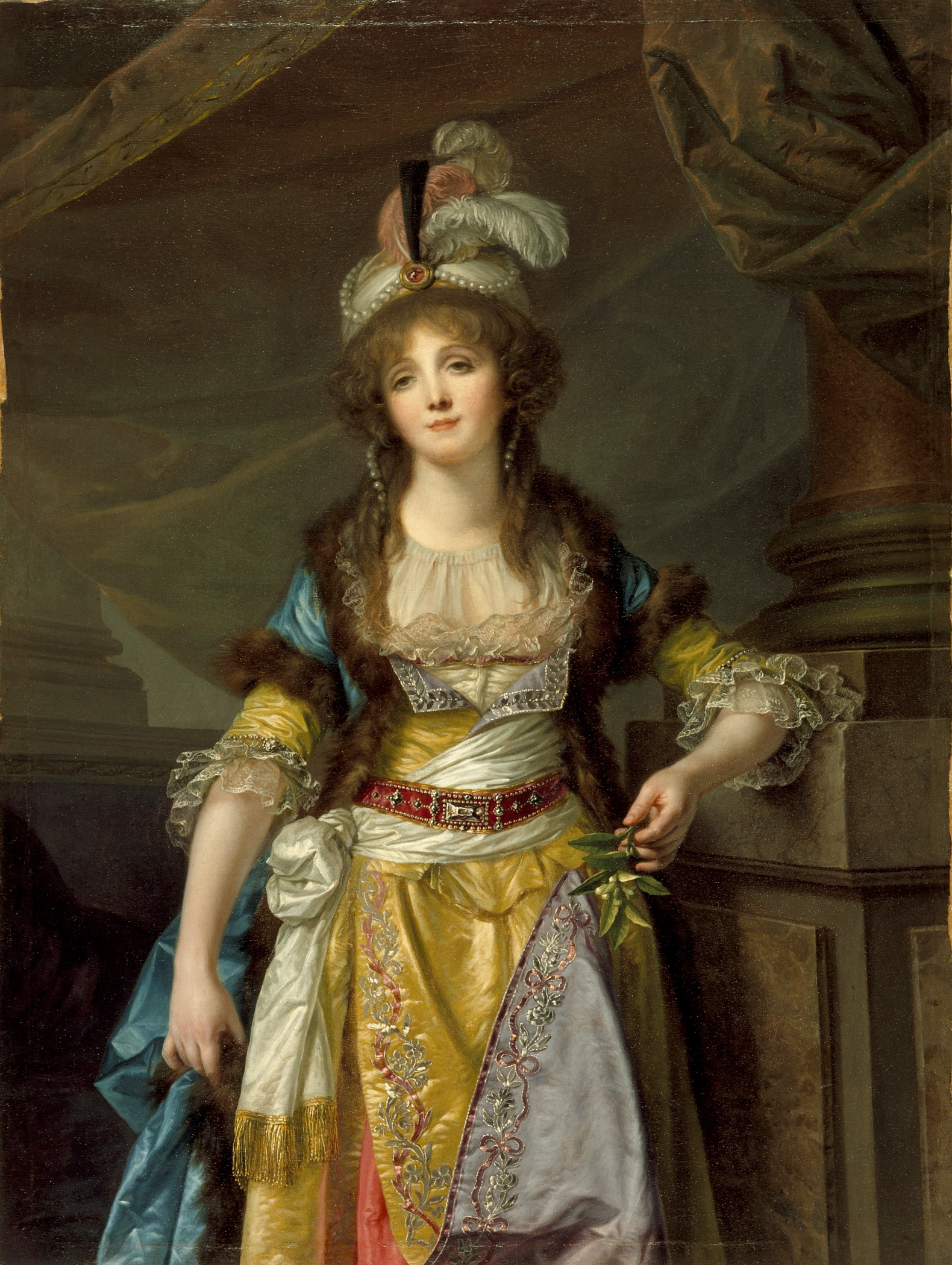
Portrait of a Lady in Turkish Fancy Dress by Jean-Baptiste Greuze (c. 1790)

New patterns of consumption were arising, especially with trading ships being able to navigate around Africa. Commodities that were once expensive were becoming more affordable. Products often define people in terms of gender, age, and availability of access. This notion of social definition outlines the main theme of the explosion of commodities from the 16th century and onwards. The exchange system had to do precisely with accessibility and availability of commodities on a grand scale. This was not just a European phenomenon. The Europeans were not the only people who developed a sensibility of how consuming different things could define their relationships domestically and abroad. In this context, there was a broader view of consumption and one's place within the world. A person would consume in order to show off their financial position and their social location.

=== Coffee ===
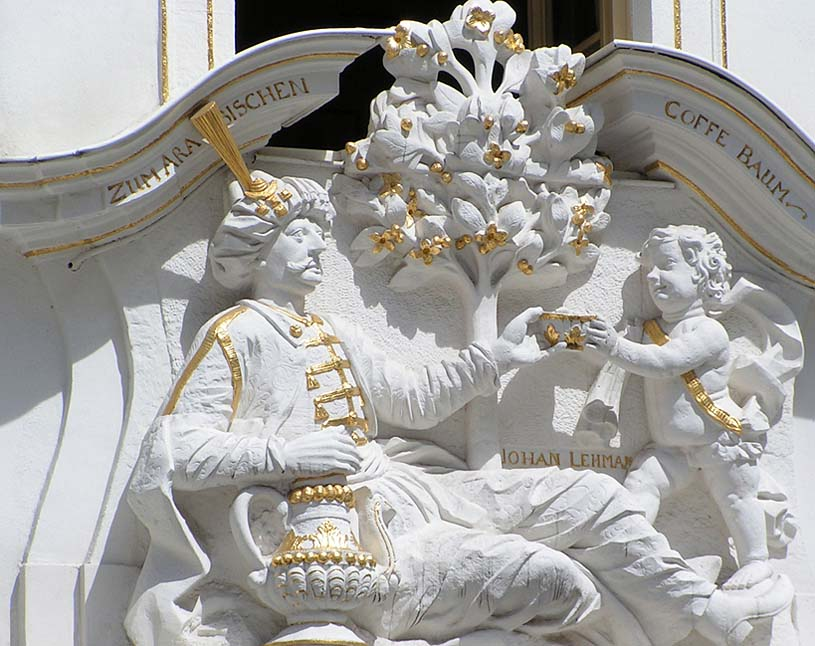
Over the door of a Leipzig coffeeshop is a sculptural representation of a man in Turkish dress, receiving a cup of coffee from a boy.

When coffee was first imported to Europe, locals looked to its place of origin to better understand the new phenomenon. Ottoman scholars—who had been studying the plant for centuries and were producing relevant, new sources—became the main reference for Edward Pococke and Antoine Galland’s written works on coffee. Academia, such as this, was a key component within coffeehouse culture. The history of coffee in Europe as a product was inextricably linked to this culture. It was “an institution and a set of customs…transferred from one region to another,” in this case from the Ottoman Empire to western Europe. The introduction of coffee to the European scene was neither new nor just a common consumable good; it was a direct result of “Ottoman mediation.”

Visiting elites from high-class European circles were frequently exposed to the drink through Ottoman elites and diplomacy, complete with porcelain, embroidered napkins, and special etiquette. Furthermore, visiting Ottoman military or diplomatic officials would serve coffee in similar ways within European cities. Adhering to strict instructions, sequences, and measures, good coffee had to be prepared with a precision that the Ottomans had perfected, a skillset that Europeans had yet to learn to apply to their version of the bitter, crude drink.

=== European perspective ===
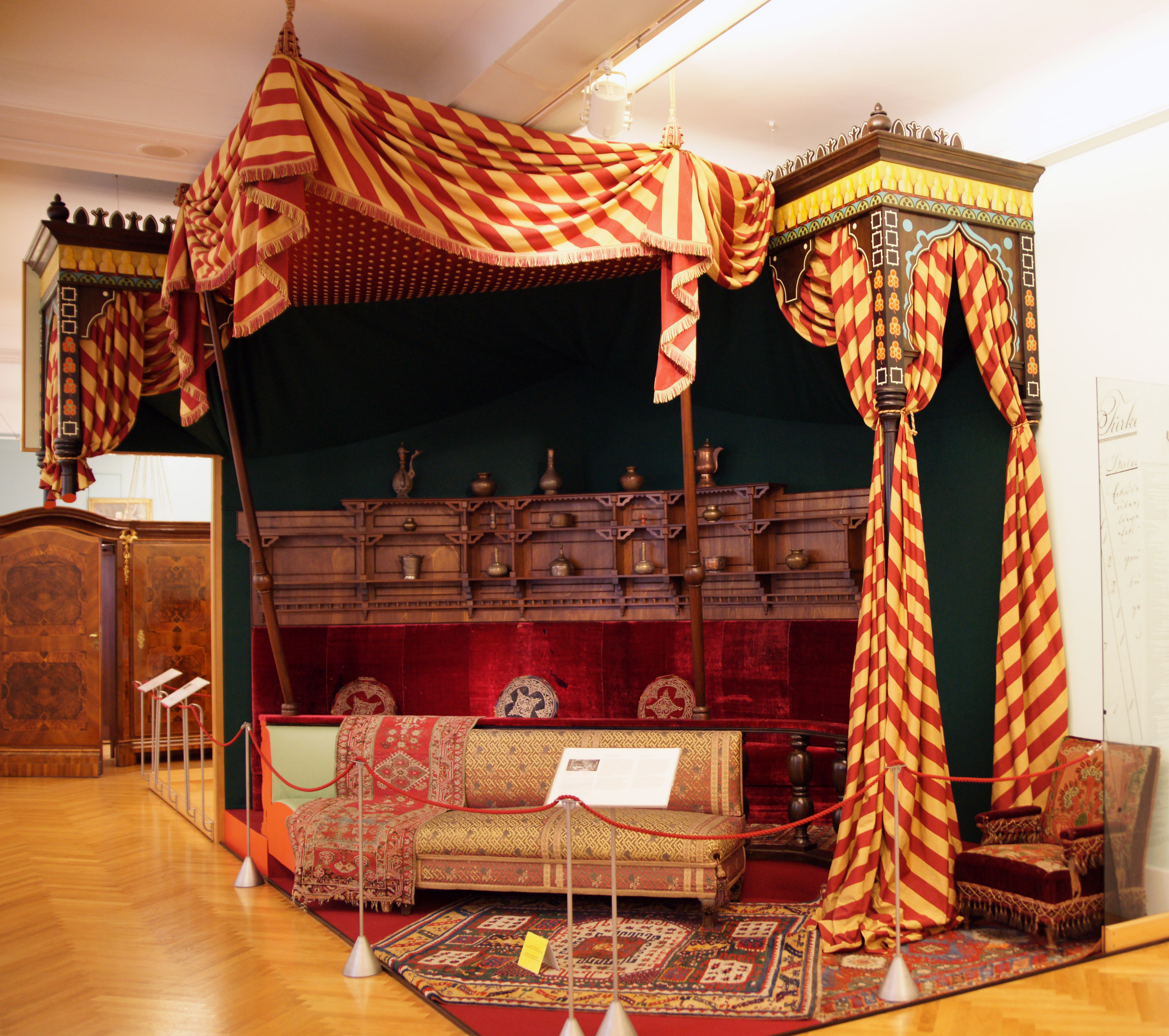
Rudolf, Crown Prince of Austria had his working room decorated in the Turkish style in 1881. It is partially preserved at the Imperial Furniture Collection in Vienna.

Europeans developed an appetite for exoticism as greater emphasis was put on empire building and colonization in other nations. There was a growing fashion for Turkish styles in Europe in the 15th and 16th centuries. Europeans did not regard Ottomans as rivals that they had to contend with and imitate militarily, politically, or diplomatically, but rather as an exotic foreign people possessing quaint and strange fashions that could be consumed. Consuming these exotic fashions would show one's elite place in society as well as display their open-mindedness and interest in the world. These "obsessions" with Turkish aesthetics were in part brought on by the presence of Europeans in the Ottoman Court and the acts of bringing back their products to Europe. The increased mercantile relationships between the Turkish people and the Europeans aided this process; the continuation of these trading systems helped to spread new fashions quickly in Europe.

== Decorations and patterns ==
Brightly colored Turkish styles of decoration were used on many types of objects, including timepieces. Many of those imported had the hours and religious names in Arabic characters. A person who owned one of these timepieces was one with an increased social status.

The Turkish grandeur portrayed by the sultans was attractive to Europeans. Agostino Veneziano made a portrait of Suleyman the Magnificent, sultan of the Ottoman Empire in 1520. He was known as the “grand Turk” for his conquests in Europe.

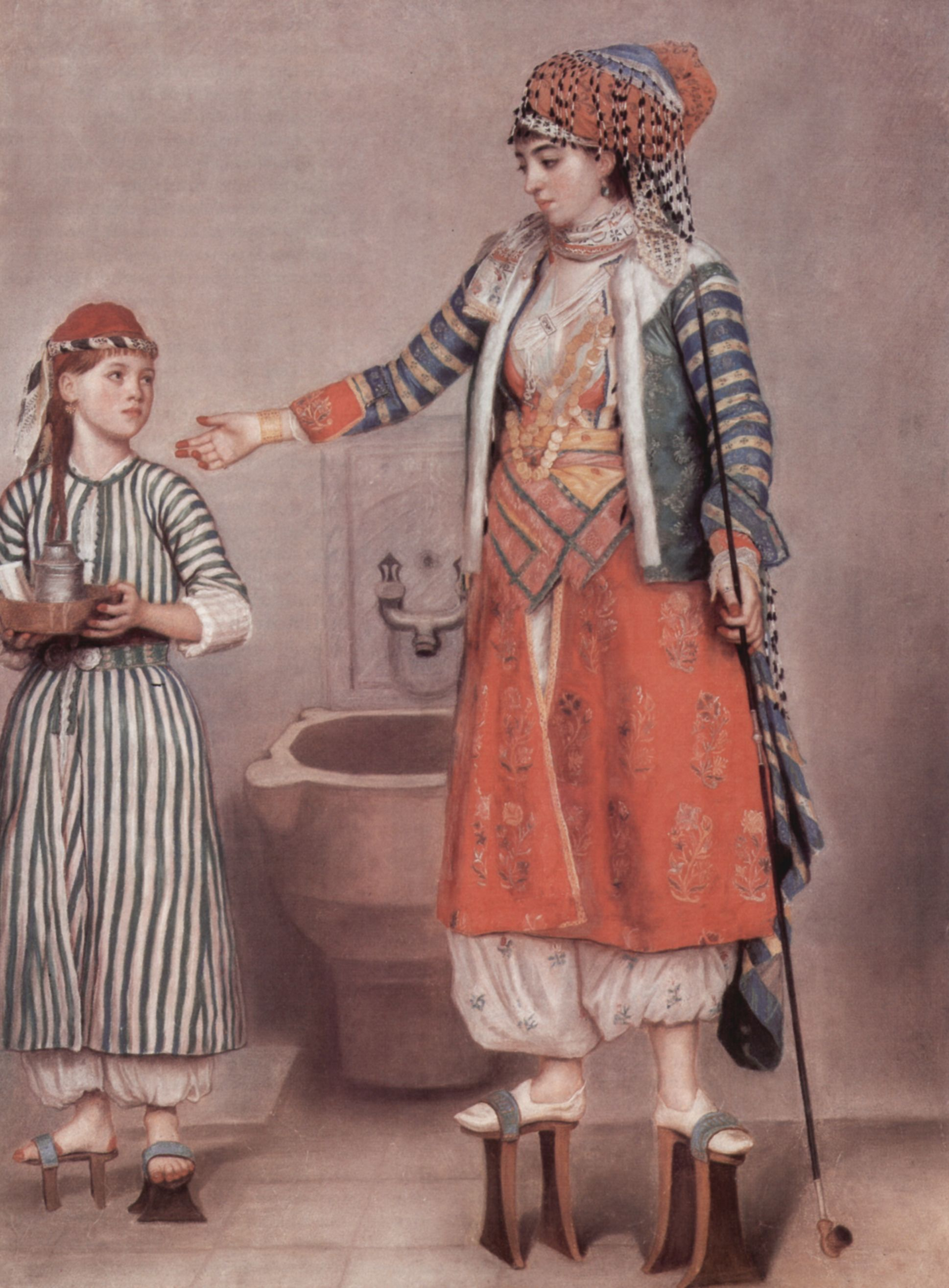
Two 18th century Turkish women, pastel by Jean-Étienne Liotard, who visited Turkey with a British ambassador in 1738. Unlike their baggy trousers, the huge pattens worn by the women would not have struck Europeans as remarkable, as Western women wore similar overshoes.

Fabrics were often bright, rich, and embroidered, as depicted in the painting, Himan de la Grande Mosquee by Joseph-Marie Vien in 1748. In the context of turquerie, Turkish textiles were also a luxury in the elitist European homes. They often had velvet grounds with stylized floral motifs. They were often woven in Asia Minor for the European market or, more commonly, as Venetian, under Turkish influence. Italian-styled textiles were often woven by the Ottoman Turks for the Venetians through trade.

== Portraits: European and American ==
Social position was something very important in the 18th century so things like dress, posture, and props were carefully selected in order to communicate one's status. This need to express status mixed with a new interest for Turkish style allowed for Turkish dress and decorations to become very important props. This included wearing loose, flowing gowns belted with ornate bands of embroidered cloth and ermine-trimmed robes with tasseled turbans. Women even abandoned their corsets and attached strings of pearls to their hair for much more freeing material.

The loose clothing and the unorthodox styles added to the lewd perceptions of the Ottomans. This interest was something that motivated the creation of many portraits where Turkish people were often depicted as exotic, and it became rare to see portraits where they were painted without wearing their traditional cultural clothing. Writing also contributed to the visual aspect of Turkish cultural exchange and perhaps the most influential transformation into the turquerie vogue in Europe was done by Lady Mary Wortley Montagu. Montagu went to Turkey in 1717 when her husband was posted as ambassador there. Her collected letters describing Turkish fashion were widely distributed in manuscript form in her social circle and were then printed for the public upon her death in 1762. Her letters and descriptions helped shape how Europeans interpreted the Turkish fashion and how to dress. This phenomenon eventually found its way across the Atlantic and in colonial America, where Montagu's letters were also published.

== Music ==
The music in operas that utilized the notion of turquerie was not seriously influenced by Turkish music. Composers in the 18th century were not interested in ethnomusicology, to adopt the style of sound of a particular country or area. The European audiences were not yet ready to accept the unappealing and what they thought of as primitive musical style of the Turkish people. Traditional Turkish music included wavering pitches, microtones, arabesques, different scale systems, and non-Western rhythmic patterns. Europeans thought of this type of music, as Wolfgang Amadeus Mozart once said, "offensive to the ears." Having short spurts of it in the operas were common, but just to add comedic affect.

In music, Orientalism may be applied to styles occurring in different periods, such as the alla turca, used by multiple composers including Mozart and Beethoven.

=== Opera ===
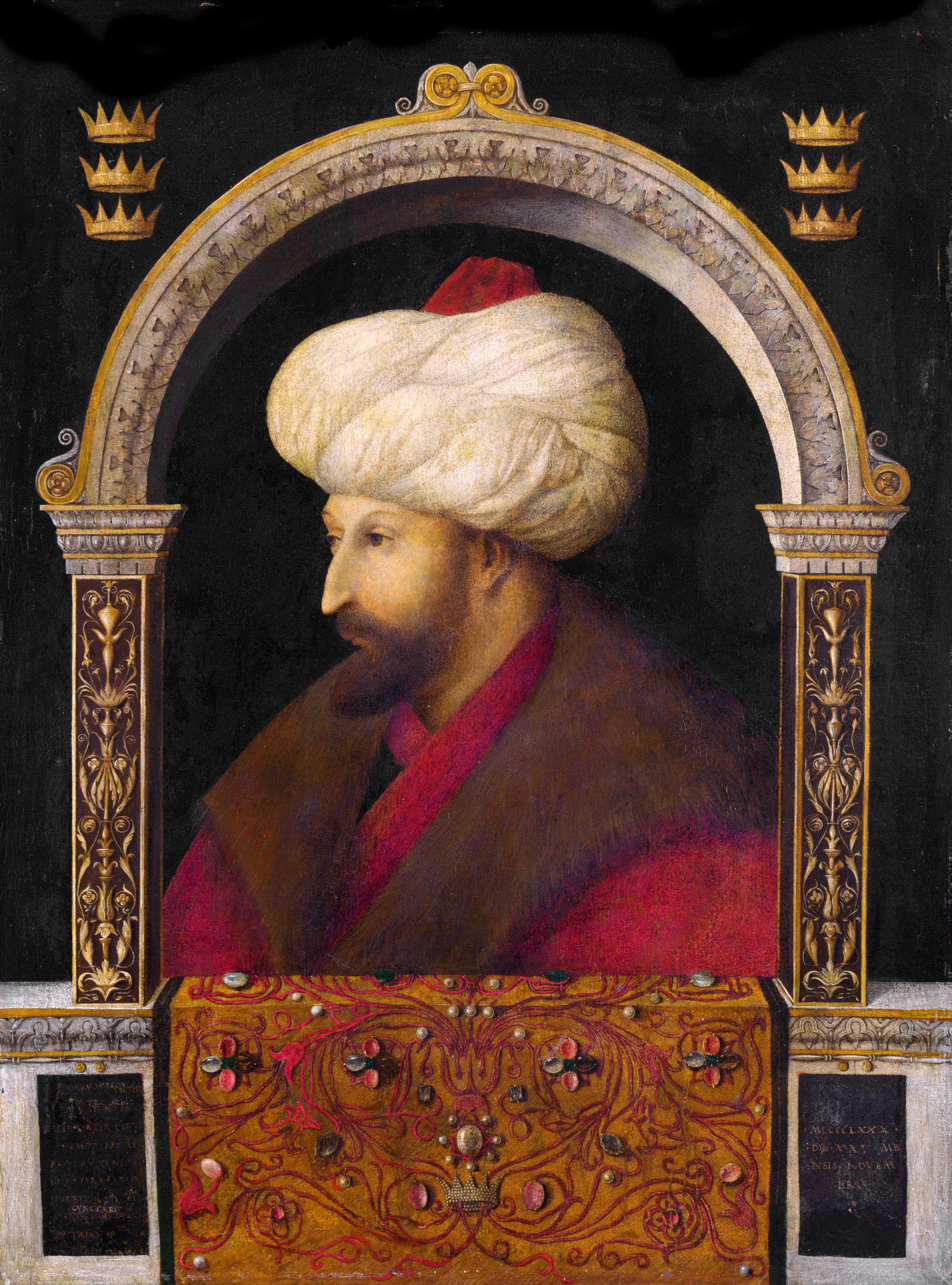
Portrait of Sultan Mehmed II by Gentile Bellini (c. 1480, but largely repainted later), who visited Istanbul and painted many scenes of the city

European opera was influenced heavily by the idea of turquerie. Mehmed the Conqueror (1432–1481), one of the most prominent sultans of the Ottoman Empire, had many operas written about him. His conquest of Constantinople in 1453 was the basis of the German opera Mahumeth II, composed by Reinhard Keiser in 1693. In 1820, Gioachino Rossini composed Maometto II, which is set during the Siege of Negroponte (1470) by the forces of the Ottoman Empire, led by Sultan Mehmed II.

Moreover, there were many operas based on the ongoing conflicts between Timur and Beyazid I, including Tamerlano by George Handel. These stories of perseverance and passion appealed to many Europeans and therefore gained popularity. One of France’s most important opera genres was tragédie en musique, depicted by Scanderberg, with music by François Rebel and Francois Francoeur, set to a libretto by Antoine Houdar de la Motte in 1735. This opera was visually one of the most elaborate of the Turkish operas, with detailed scenic designs for mosques and seraglio courts.

Operas using themes from turquerie were in the usual European languages but tried to imitate the Turkish culture and customs. It offered a world of fantasy, splendor, and adventure that was unattainable by the average person. Audiences would be fascinated with the Turkish and Ottoman institutions depicted. The stories and implications as well as the extravagant costumes and elaborate staging appealed to the people. The Europeans craved reality in their depiction of the Turkish peoples. During performances, females would often be in the latest fashion, where local colour was suggested by foreign attire or numerous ornaments. The males tended to wear more authentic Turkish dress than the female, including a turban, sash, long caftan, and binding with rich material, since authentic Turkish female dress was often restrictive and plain.

== See also ==
- Bloomers
- Harem pants
- Turkish clogs
- Hammam
- Oriental carpets in Renaissance painting
- Ottoman clothing
- Sarmatism
- Slim-fit pants
- Pajamas
- Chapan
- Turkish crescent
- Chinoiserie
- Seraglio
- Turkey
- Turkophilia
- Turkeywork

== Notes ==
=== References ===
- Breskin, Isabel (2001). ""On the periphery of a greater world": John Singleton Copley's Turquerie portraits". Winterthur Portfolio. 36 (2/3): 97–123. doi:10.1086/496848. JSTOR 1215305. S2CID 154329218.
- Levey, Michael (1975). The World of Ottoman Art. Thames & Hudson. ISBN 0-500-27065-1.
- Metropolitan Museum of Art (1968). "Turquerie". The Metropolitan Museum of Art Bulletin. New Series. 26 (5): 225–239. doi:10.2307/3258981. JSTOR 3258981.
- Meyer, Eve R. (1974). "Turquerie and eighteenth-century music". Eighteenth-Century Studies. 7 (4): 474–488. doi:10.2307/3031600. JSTOR 3031600.
- Stein, Perrin (1996). "Amédée Van Loo's costume turc: the French sultana". The Art Bulletin. 78 (3): 417–438. doi:10.2307/3046193. JSTOR 3046193. S2CID 153746099.
