= Velveteen =

Type of cloth made to imitate velvet

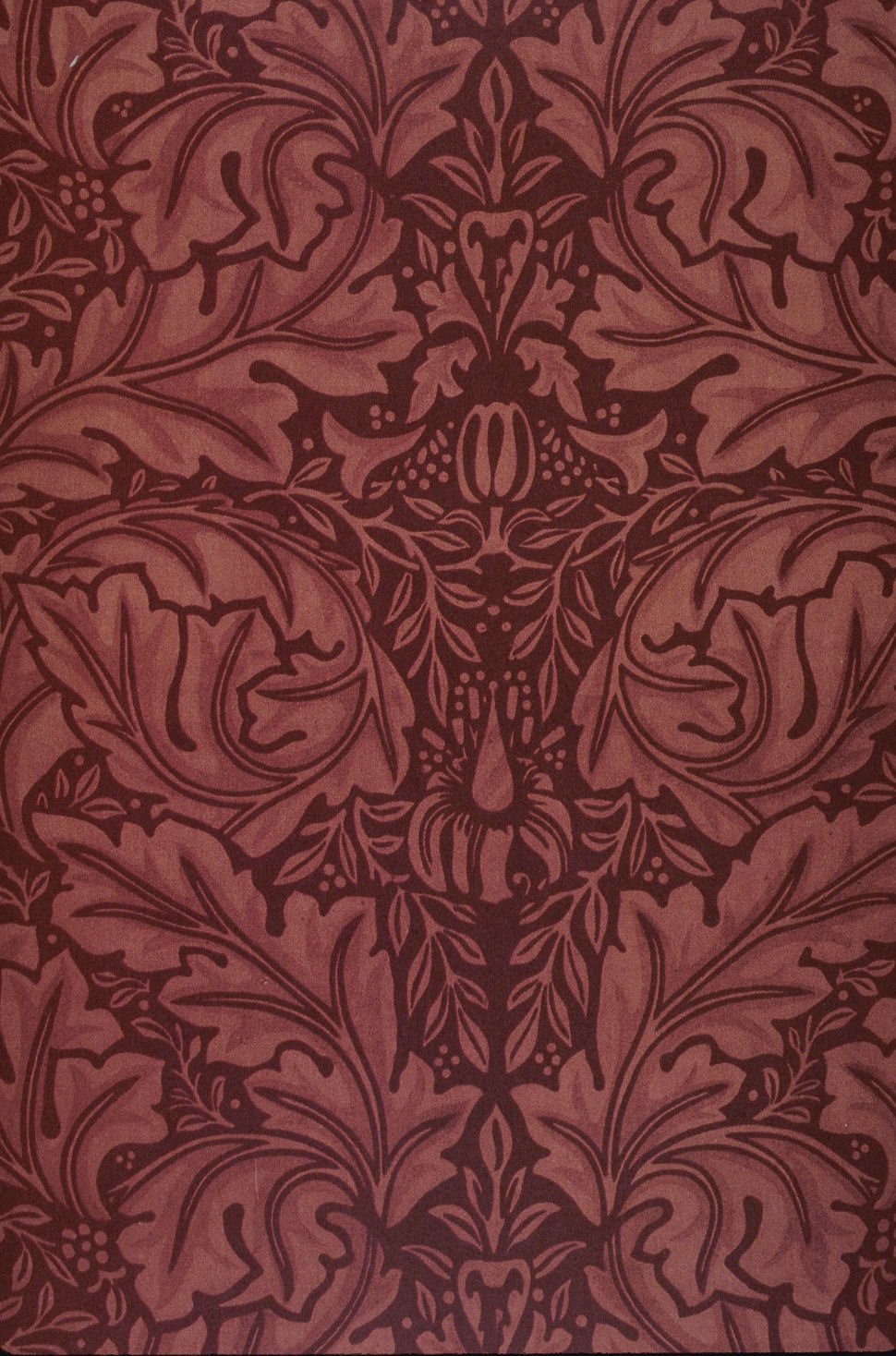
Block-printed velveteen fabric designed by William Morris

Velveteen (or velveret) is a type of woven fabric with a dense, even, short pile. It has less sheen than velvet because the pile in velveteen is cut from weft threads, while that of velvet is cut from warp threads. Velveteen also has a shorter pile than velvet and is stiffer, with less drape, and is usually made of cotton or a cotton-silk blend.

Velveteen is typically used for upholstery, or in fashion for garments that need stiffness, structure, or durability. Some velveteens are a kind of fustian, having a rib of velvet pile alternating with a plain depression.

Historically, the velveteen trade varied with the fashions that controlled the production of velvet.

== See also ==
- The Velveteen Rabbit
- Velour
