= Qom rug =

Persian carpet made in the Qom Province of Iran

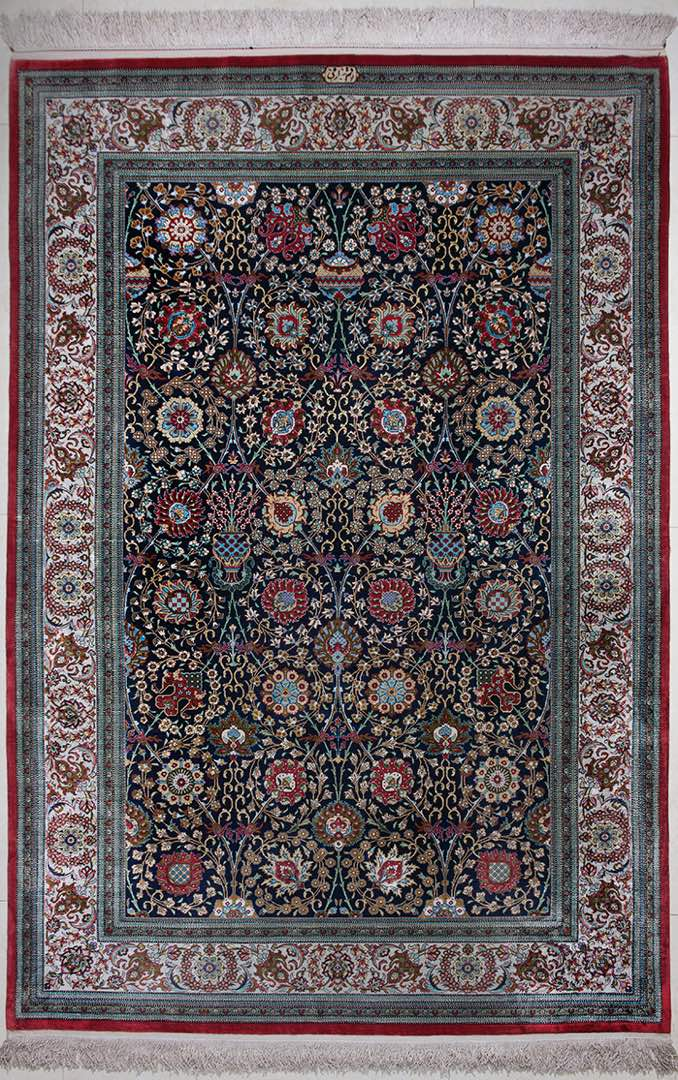
A Qom rug

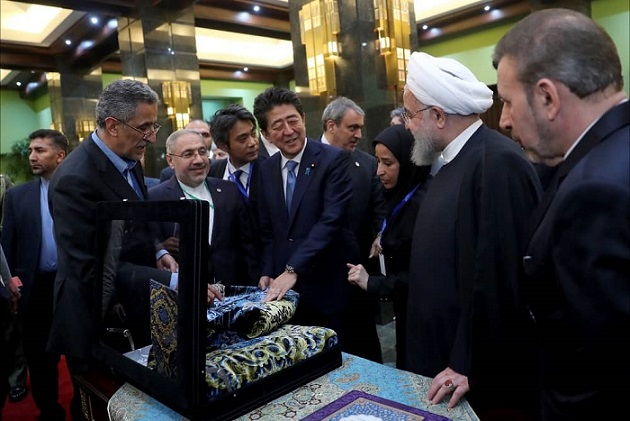
Rouhani's Gift for Abe

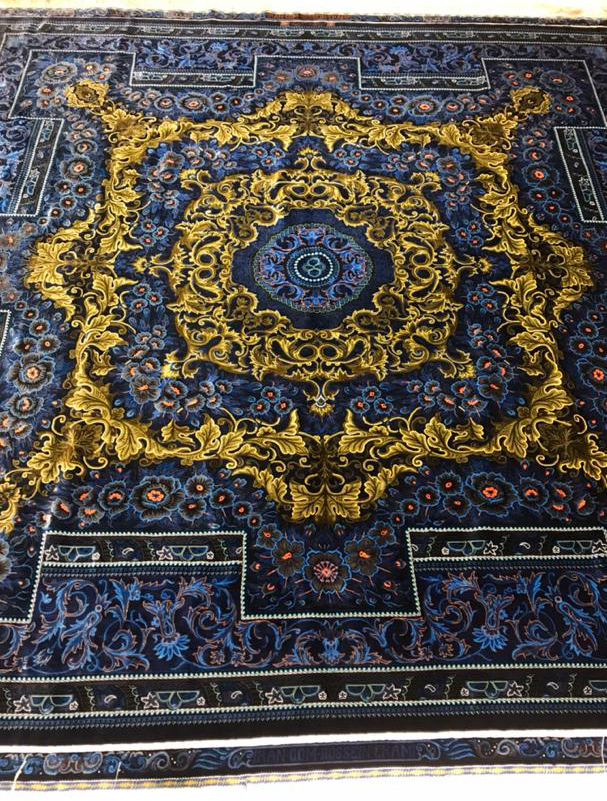
The rug given to Abe

Qom rugs (or Qum, Ghom, Ghum) are made in the Qom Province of Iran, around 100 km south of Tehran. Although rug weaving in Qom was not a major industry until the past 100 years, the luxurious silk and wool rugs of Qom are known for their high quality and are regarded among the most expensive in the world. Persian Qum rugs are often considered as investment, because their value is constantly increasing.

Tree of life and medallion motifs feature heavily in rugs knotted in Qom. Shades are similar to most popular colors of Persian rugs - blue, red and ivory. Qom Rugs are typically smaller than other types of Persian rugs. They are often placed on walls.

== Gift for Shinzō Abe ==
During Shinzō Abe's visit to Tehran, an exquisite Qom silk carpet was given to him by Hassan Rouhani. Rouhani stated that the choice of Persian carpet as a gift shows Iranian patience, accuracy, and consistency in addition to displaying the art of carpet weaving in Iran.

The 205 × 205 cm carpet with more than 4 million knots has been woven during three years by two Qomi master weavers. This carpet is one of the artistic works of the workshop of Hossein Ermi and is filled with beautiful designs of Golfarang (rose pattern) and golden medallion with the varieties of blue. Gold Lachak (Corners) in a blend with middle Toranj (medallion) are combined in a new mix of Iranian miniature with the main border of carpet.

== See also ==
- Persian rug
