= Knotted-pile carpet =

Hand weaving technique

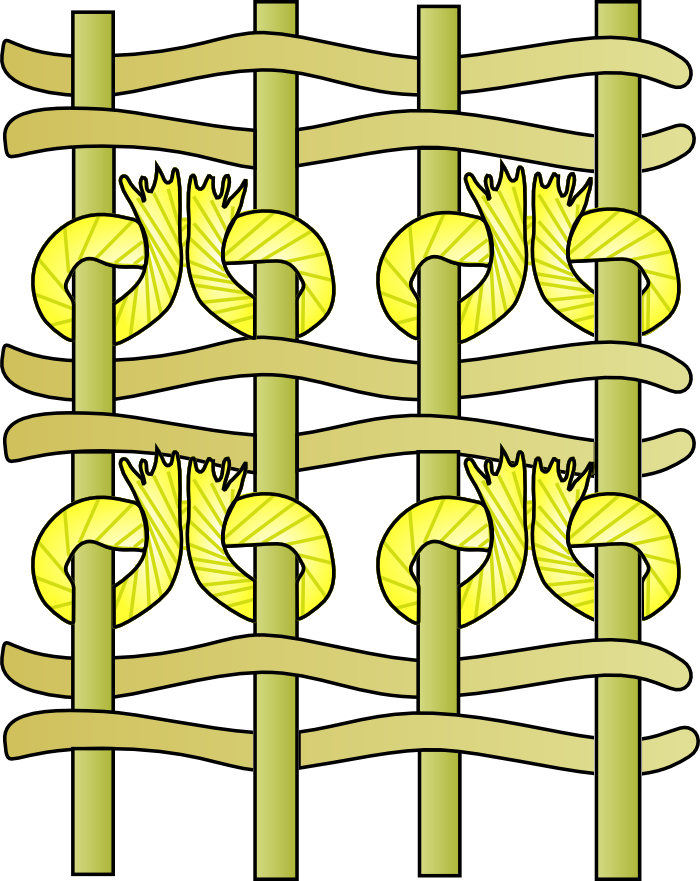
Ghiordes knot

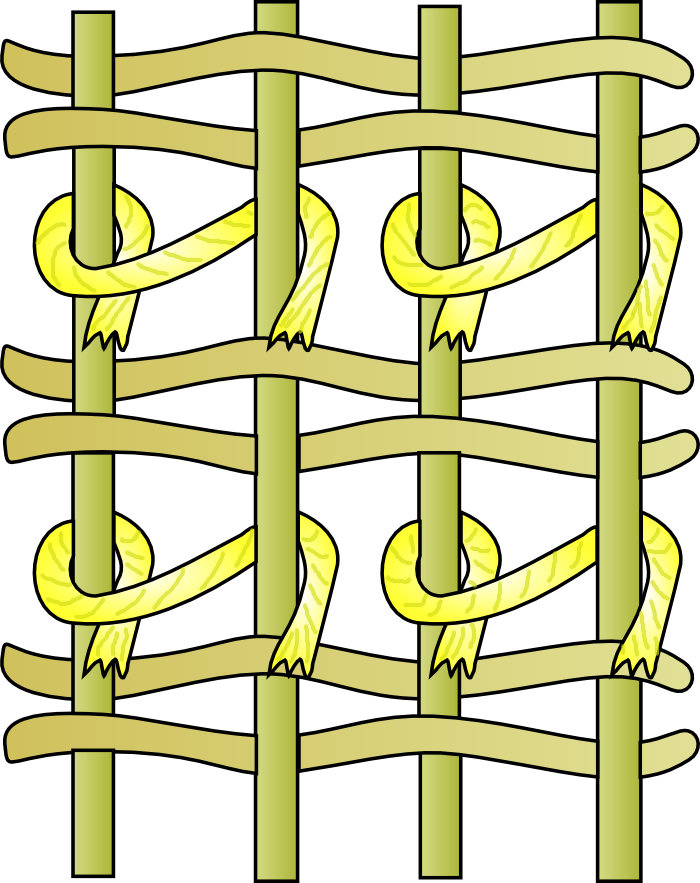
Senneh knot

The yellow yarn is the pile and the horizontal and vertical yarns are the warp and the weft.

A knotted-pile carpet is a carpet containing raised surfaces, or piles, from the cut off ends of knots woven between the warp and weft. The Ghiordes/Turkish knot and the Senneh/Persian knot, typical of Anatolian carpets and Persian carpets, are the two primary knots. A flat or tapestry woven carpet, without pile, is a kilim. A pile carpet is influenced by width and number of warp and weft, pile height, knots used, and knot density.

"The structural weft threads alternate with supplementary weft that rises from the surface of the weave at a perpendicular angle. This supplementary weft is attached to the warp by one of three knots... to form the pile or nap of the carpet." Knots are tied in rows, one to each pair of warp threads, which may then be pushed down to make the rug more solid: "the interwoven warp and weft threads form the carpet's foundation, and the design comes from the rows of knots." "In the knotted-pile...the arrangement of rows of weft is the dominant consideration."

Diagonal, or offset, knotting has knots in successive rows occupy alternate pairs of warps. This feature allows for changes from one half knot to the next, and creates diagonal pattern lines at different angles. It is sometimes found in Kurdish or Turkmen rugs, particularly in Yomuds. It is mostly tied symmetrically.

== Ghiordes ==
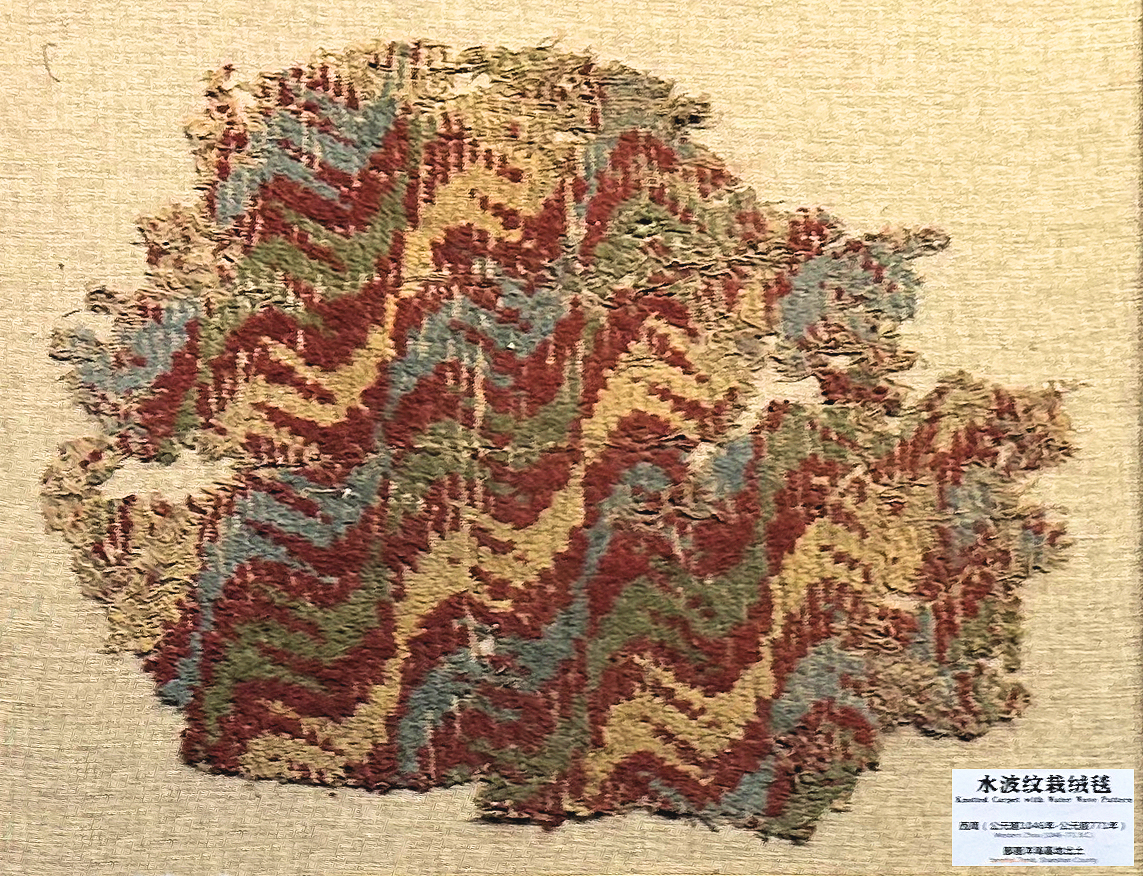
Knotted carpet with colorful wave-like motifs from Yanghai (Subeshi culture) were dated to 700 BCE, and are now the oldest known knotted carpet in the world, before the 4th century BCE Pazyryk carpets. Turpan Museum.

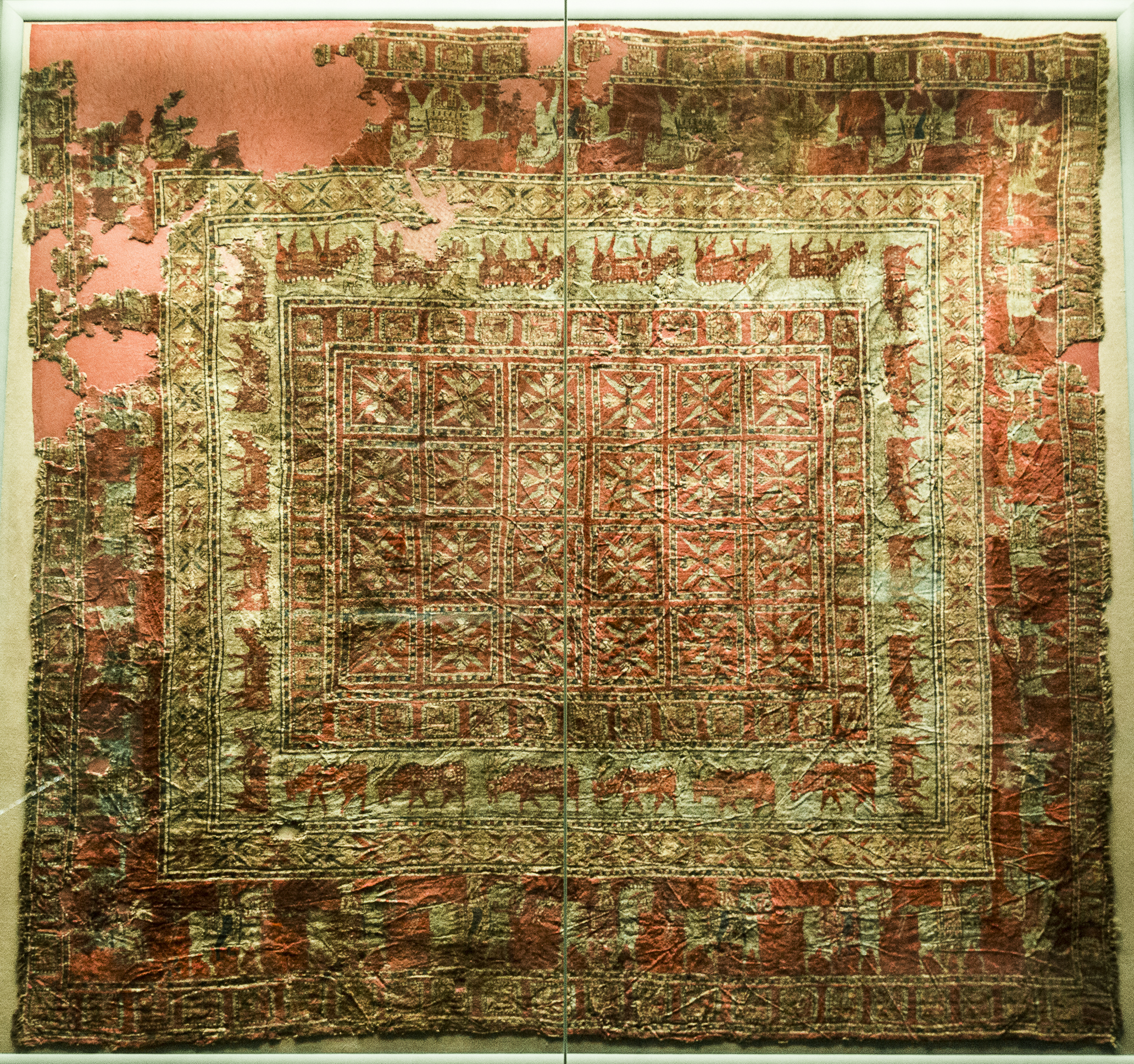
Decorated knotted-pile carpet from Pazyryk-5. 4th century BCE.

The Ghiordes knot, symmetrical knot or Turkish knot is one of the two most-used knots employed in knotted-pile carpets. In the Ghiordes knot, the colored weft yarn passes over the two warp yarns, and is pulled through between them and then cut to form the pile. The Ghiordes knot has a symmetrical structure. The Ghiordes knot is the knot used in the oldest surviving pile carpets, the fragments found in Pazyryk kurgan burial mounds, in the Altai of Central Asia. The Ghiordes knot is also used in Turkeywork textiles of the Early Modern period.

To tie a Ghiordes knot, the yarn is passed between two adjacent warps, brought back under one, wrapped around both forming a collar, then pulled through the center so that both ends emerge between the warps. The Ghiordes knot uses two warps.

== Senneh ==
Persian carpets are mainly woven with two different knots: the symmetrical Turkish or "Ghiordes" knot, also used in Turkey, the Caucasus, East Turkmenistan, and some Turkish and Kurdish areas of Iran; and the asymmetrical Persian, or Senneh knot, also used in India, Turkey, Pakistan, China, and Egypt. The term "Senneh knot" is somewhat misleading, as rugs are woven with symmetric knots in the town of Senneh.

The asymmetric knot is tied by wrapping the yarn around only one warp, then the thread is passed behind the adjacent warp so that it divides the two ends of the yarn. The Persian knot may open on the left or the right. The Persian knot may be considered as using two warps, or only warp.

The asymmetric knot allows the artist to produce more fluent, often curvilinear designs, while more bold, rectilinear designs may use the symmetric knot. As exemplified by Senneh rugs with their elaborate designs woven with asymmetric knots, the quality of the design depends more on the weaver's skills, than on the type of knot which is used.

== Jufti ==
Another knot frequently used in Persian carpets is the Jufti knot, which is tied around four warps instead of two. A serviceable carpet can be made with jufti knots, and jufti knots are sometimes used in large single-colour areas of a rug, for example in the field, to save on material. However, as carpets woven wholly or partly with the jufti knot need only half the amount of pile yarn compared to traditionally woven carpets, their pile is less resistant to wear, and these rugs do not last as long.

== Other knots ==
Another variant of knot is known from early Spanish rugs. The Spanish knot or single-warp knot, is tied around one single warp. Some of the rug fragments excavated by A. Stein in Turfan seem to be woven with a single knot. Single knot weavings are also known from Egyptian Coptic pile rugs.

== Knot gallery ==
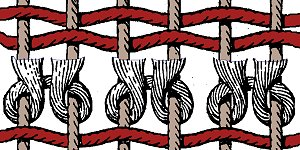
Turkish (symmetric) knot

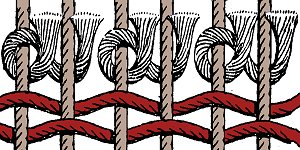
Persian (asymmetric) knot, open to the right

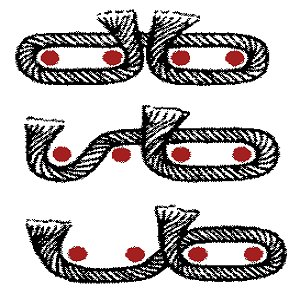
Variants of the "Jufti" knot woven around four warps

Spanish knot or single-warp knot

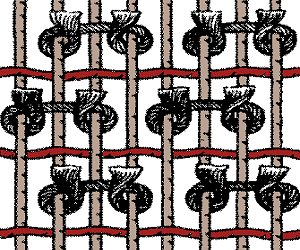
Diagonal, or offset, knotting

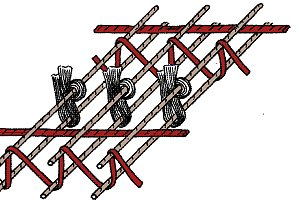
Weaving with one warp depressed

Knitting an asymmetric knot, open to the right, with a knitting hook similar to the Tabriz type

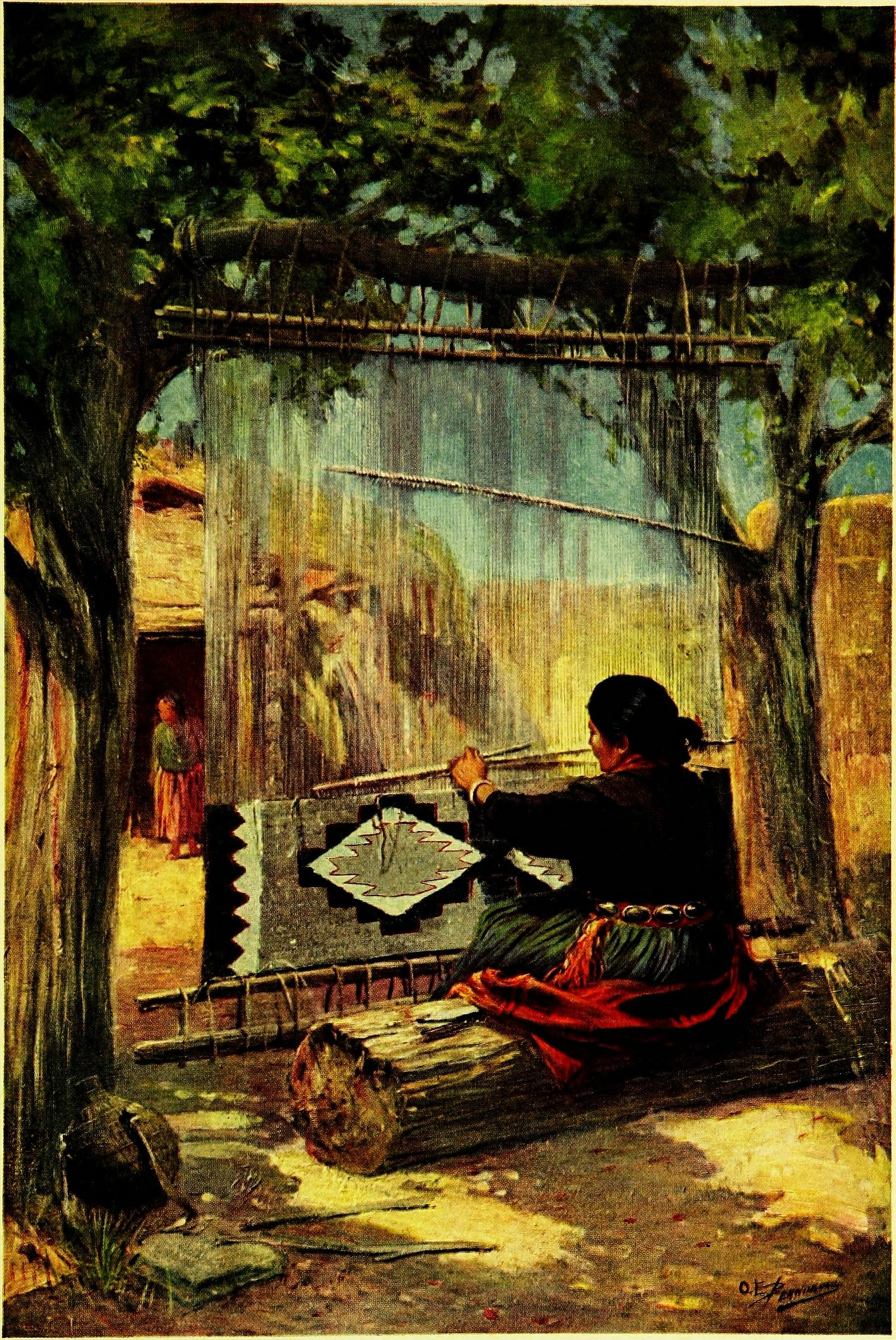

== See also ==
- Pile weave
