= Turkeywork =

English knotted-and-cut pile textile

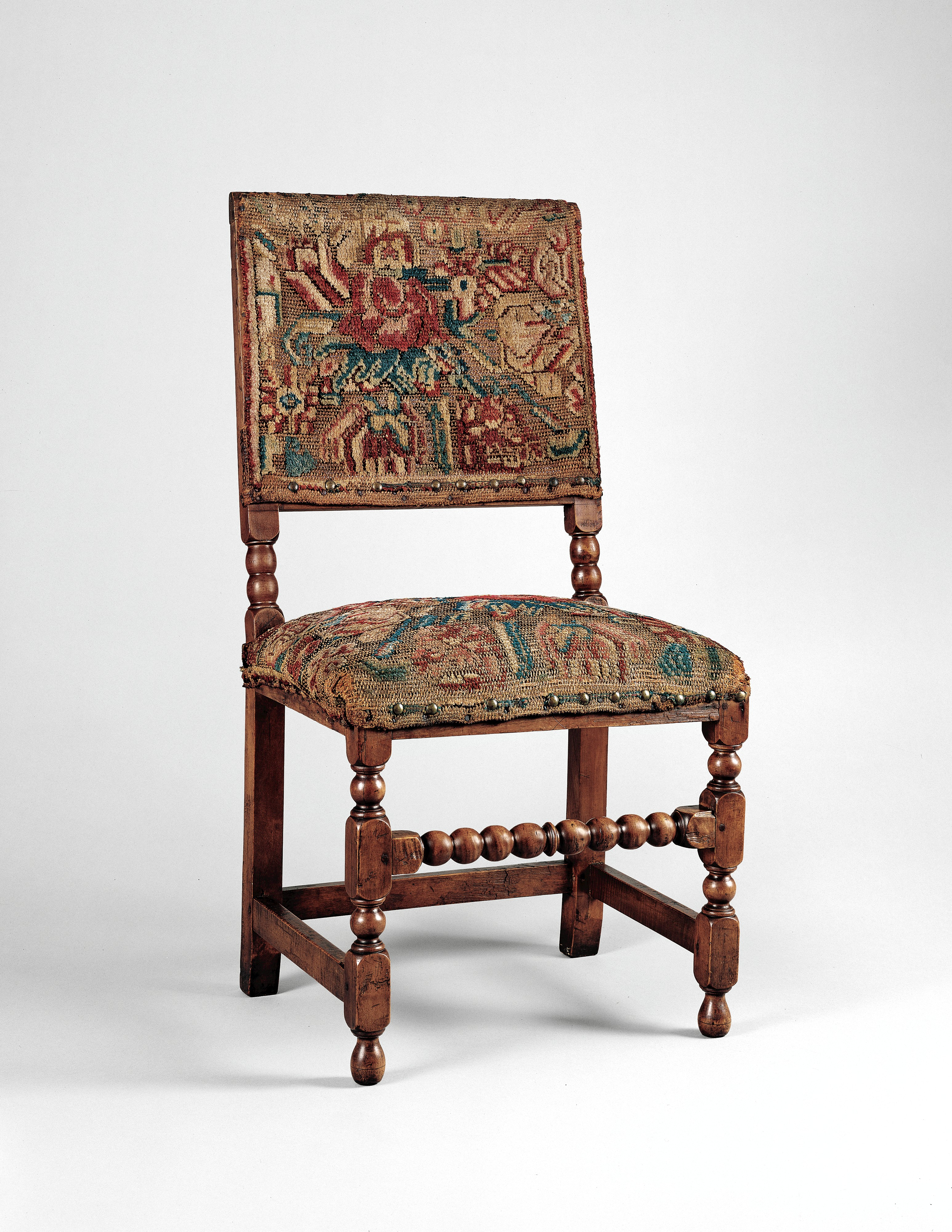
- Turkeywork chair, between 1680 and 1700, American frame and English export textile, The MET. The original black background of this textile has almost entirely worn away.
- Years active: 16th to mid-18th centuries
- Location: England
- Influences: Oriental textiles

Turkeywork (alternately turkey-work or turkey work; sometimes called setwork and Norwich work) is a knotted-and-cut pile furnishing textile produced in England from the sixteenth to the mid-eighteenth centuries. Turkeywork was used for table carpets, cupboard carpets, cushions, and especially for matched upholstery sets for chair seats and backs.

== Production ==
Turkeywork was produced by professional weavers in England from the 16th century. Short lengths or thrums of worsted wool were hand-knotted using the Turkish or Ghiordes knot (also called the symmetrical knot) on a linen or hemp-fibre warp. The colorful wool was shorn to produce a dense, even pile. Designs originally imitated so-called 'Turkey carpets', the general name in Early Modern England for imported carpets of Middle Eastern origin, which became popular for furniture covers (and less often, floor carpets) in the 16th century. It is sometimes said that Early Modern turkeywork upholstery is a form of needlework, but this is no longer generally accepted.

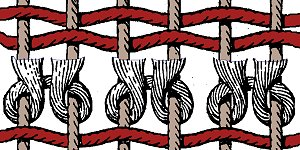
Turkish, Ghiordes, or symmetrical knot

Economic historian Eric Kerridge records commercial production of turkeywork carpets as early as 1553 in Windsor, and "in Norwich in 1583, in York in 1595, and in Bradford in 1639". These carpets were used to cover tables, hutches, and similar furniture, as well as for cushions and chair seats. Turkeywork was generally too expensive for use as floor carpets, "for each knot had to be formed separately by laying a thrum across two warp ends, folding it back under and inwards, and drawing its two ends up between the warps." However, for "chairs given hard use in eating, meeting, and parade rooms, it formed an especially satisfactory covering, being both durable and colorful." Turkeywork chairs were ordered by the dozen for meeting and committee rooms in the Palace of Whitehall and Holyrood Palace, and turkeywork coverings for seating furniture were exported to both Europe and Colonial America. The 1658 inventory of a Boston merchant includes "2 turkie bottoms and backs for chayres", and a 1685 inventory in Philadelphia includes "1 doz. and 6 new backs & seats of Turkey work for Chairs".

Turkeywork upholstery slowly fell out of fashion in favor of caned seating, associated with the William and Mary style of the early 18th century. The output of the turkeywork industry in its heyday had been prodigious. A 1698 petition to the king to outlaw the making of cane chairs in Britain to protect jobs asserted that before caning became popular, "there were yearly made and Vended in this Kingdom above five thousand dozen of Set-work, (commonly called Turkey-work Chairs, though made in England)."

== Embroidery ==
In embroidery and needlepoint, Turkey work stitch or plush stitch is a Turkish knot worked with needle and thread on cloth or canvas. The pile may be left looped or cut to form a plush surface.
