= Pile (textile) =

Upright loops, tufts, or strands of yarn extending from the ground of a fabric

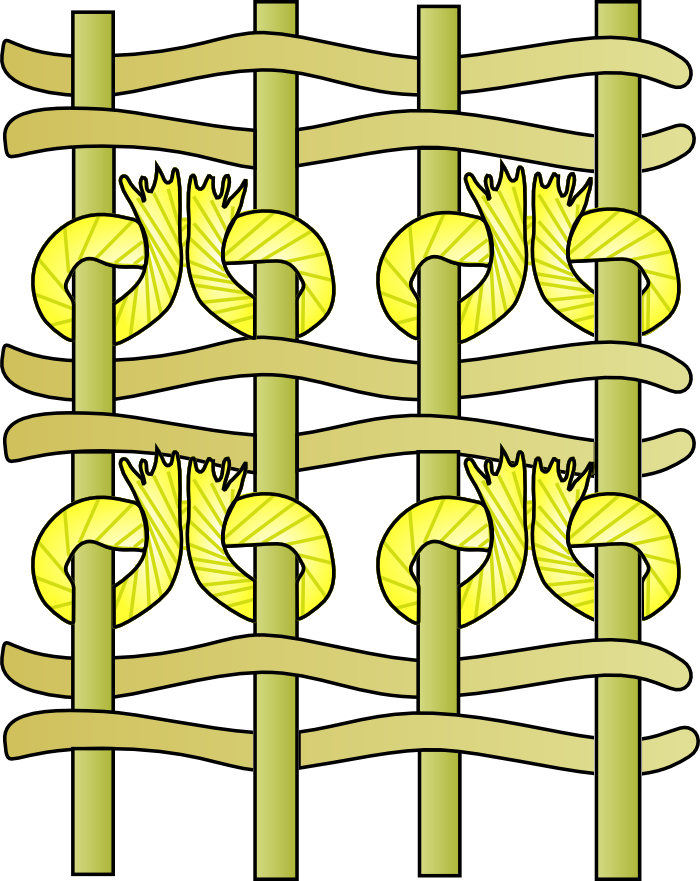
Ghiordes knot

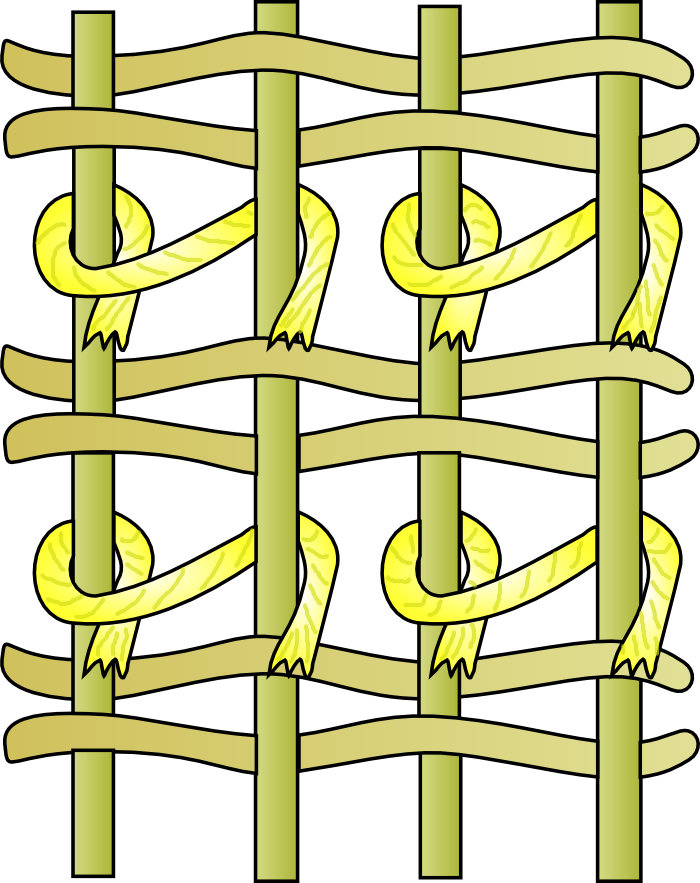
Senneh knot

The yellow yarn is the pile and the horizontal and vertical yarns are the warp and the weft

Pile is the raised surface or nap of a fabric, consisting of upright loops or strands of yarn. Examples of pile textiles are carpets, corduroy, velvet, plush, and Turkish towels (terrycloth). The word is derived from Latin pilus for "hair".

== Length and density ==
The surface and the yarn in these fabrics are also called "pile". In particular "pile length" or "pile depth" refer to the length of the yarn strands (half-length of the loops). High pile refers to longer strands and low pile refers to shorter strands.

Pile length affects and is affected by knot density: "The greater the knot density, the thinner the weft and warp yarns and the more weakly are they twisted; the smaller the density, the coarser are the foundation yarns." Designs and motifs are also affected by and affect pile depth: "A carpet design with a high knot density is better adapted to intricate and curvilinear designs, which of necessity must have a shorter pile length to avoid looking blurry. A carpet with a lesser knot density is better adapted to bold, geometric designs and can utilize a long pile for softer, more reflective surface that appeals to the sense of touch."

== Types ==
- Loop
- Uncut
- Cut
- Knotted
- Tufted
- Woven
- Cord
- Twist

== See also ==
- Carpet pile
- Pile weave
- Polar fleece
- Textile pilling
