= Knot density =

Traditional measure for quality of handmade or knotted pile carpets

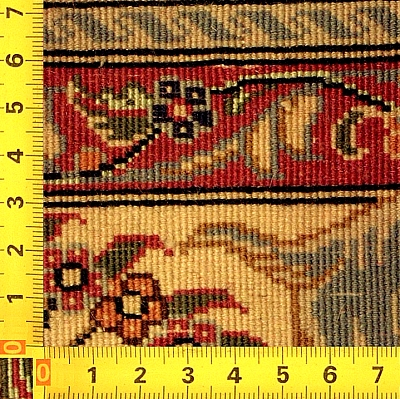
Back side of a Qom rug with very high knot density

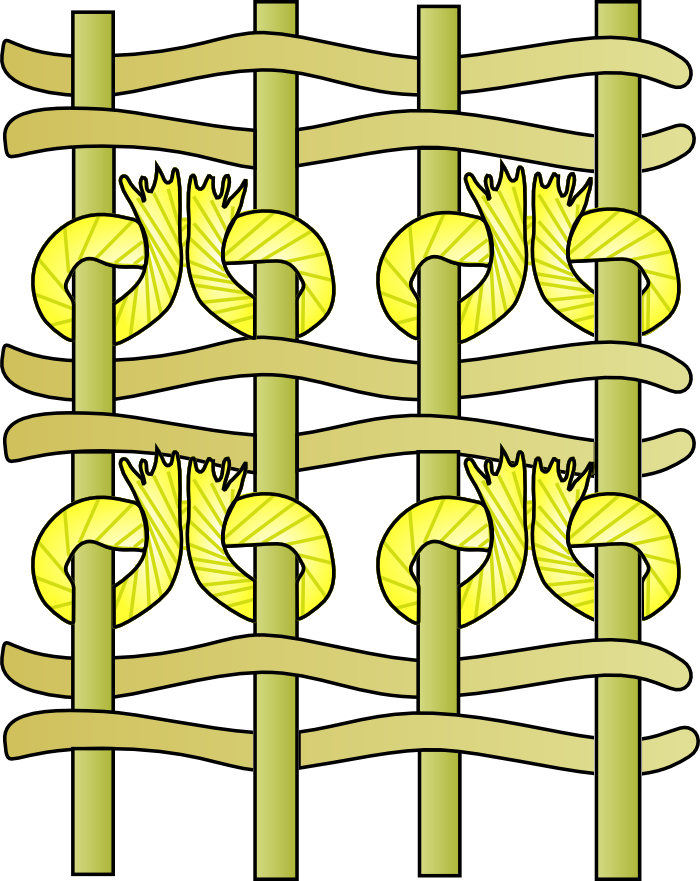
Ghiordes knot

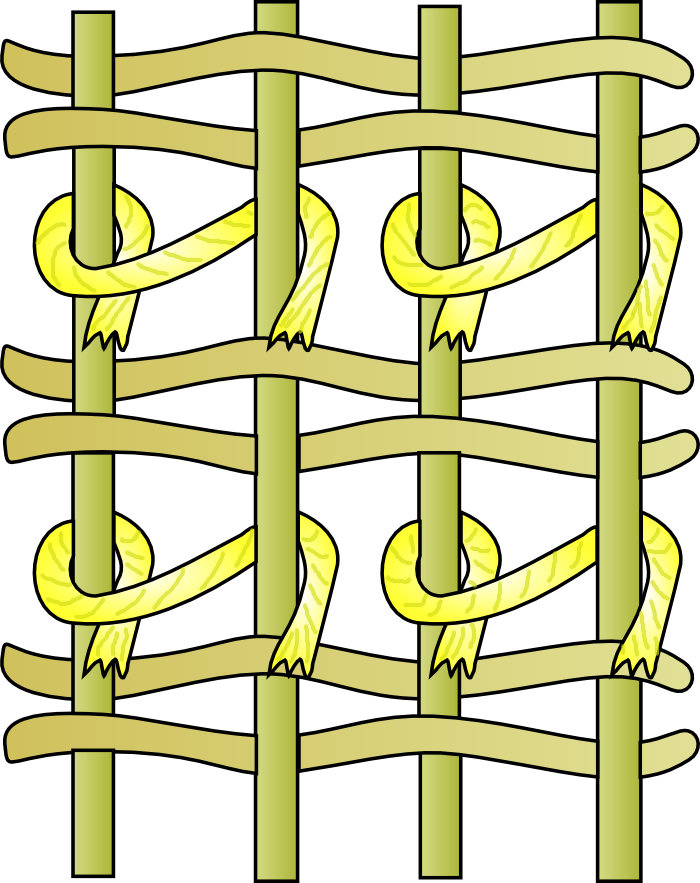
Senneh knot

The yellow yarn is the pile and the horizontal and vertical yarns are the warp and the woof

Knot density is a traditional measure for quality of handmade or knotted pile carpets. It refers to the number of knots, or knot count, per unit of surface area - typically either per square inch (kpsi) or per square centimeter (kpsc), but also per decimeter or meter (kpsd or kpsm). Number of knots per unit area is directly proportional to the quality of carpet. Density may vary from 25 to 1,000 knots per square inch (4 to 155 knots per square centimetre) or higher, where ≤80 kpsi is poor quality, 120 to 330 kpsi is medium to good, and ≥330 kpsi is very good quality. The inverse, knot ratio, is also used to compare characteristics. Knot density = warp×weft while knot ratio = warp/weft. For comparison: 100,000/square meter = 1,000/square decimeter = 65/square inch = 179/gereh.

For two carpets of the same age, origin, condition and design, the one with the higher number of knots will be the more valuable. Knot density is normally measured in knots per square inch (KPSI) which is simply the number of vertical knots across one inch of carpet multiplied by the number of horizontal knots in the same area. Average knot density varies between region and design. A rug could have a knot density half that of another yet still be more valuable, KPSI is only one measurement of quality and value in Persian carpets.

Knot density is related to and affects or affected by the thickness of the length of the pile and the width of the warp and woof, and also the designs and motifs used and their characteristics and appearance. "In rugs with a high knot density, curvilinear, elaborate motifs are possible. In those with a low knot density (as well as kilims), simpler, rectilinear, motifs tend to prevail." "A carpet design with a high knot density is better adapted to intricate and curvilinear designs, which of necessity must have a shorter pile length to avoid looking blurry. A carpet with a lesser knot density is better adapted to bold, geometric designs and can utilize a long pile for softer, more reflective surface that appeals to the sense of touch."

Hand-tying of knots is a very labour-intensive task. An average weaver can tie almost 10,000 knots per day. More difficult patterns with an above-average knot density can only be woven by a skillful weaver, thus increasing the production costs even more. An average weaver may tie 360 knots per hour (one every 10 seconds), while 1200 knots approaches the maximum a skilful weaver can tie per hour.

In the late fifteenth century a "carpet design revolution" occurred, made possible by finer yarns, and before this time it is rare to find carpets with ≥120 kpsi but by the next century carpets with three to four times that density were fairly common. For example, the Pazyryk carpet (ca. 400 BC) is around 234 kpsi and the Ardabil Carpets (ca. 1550 AD) are 300–350 kpsi. A fragment of a silk Mughal carpet in the Metropolitan Museum of Art has a knot density of 2,516 kpsi and a silk Hereke prayer rug (ca. 1970 AD) contains 4,360 symmetric kpsi. However, the rug with the highest knot density is a silk Hereke masterpiece by the Özipeks workshops, having an incredible density of approximately 10,000 kpsi, with a production time of about 15 years.

In Persian, reg (raj, rag, Persian: "row, course") refers to the knots per gereh (Persian: "knot"), which refers to a unit of approximately 2.75 inches (7.0 cm). Dihari is a unit of 6,000 knots used to measure production in India.

== See also ==
- Knot (wood)
- Thread count
