= Date palm leaf pati =

Traditional Bengali handmade furniture and house decoration

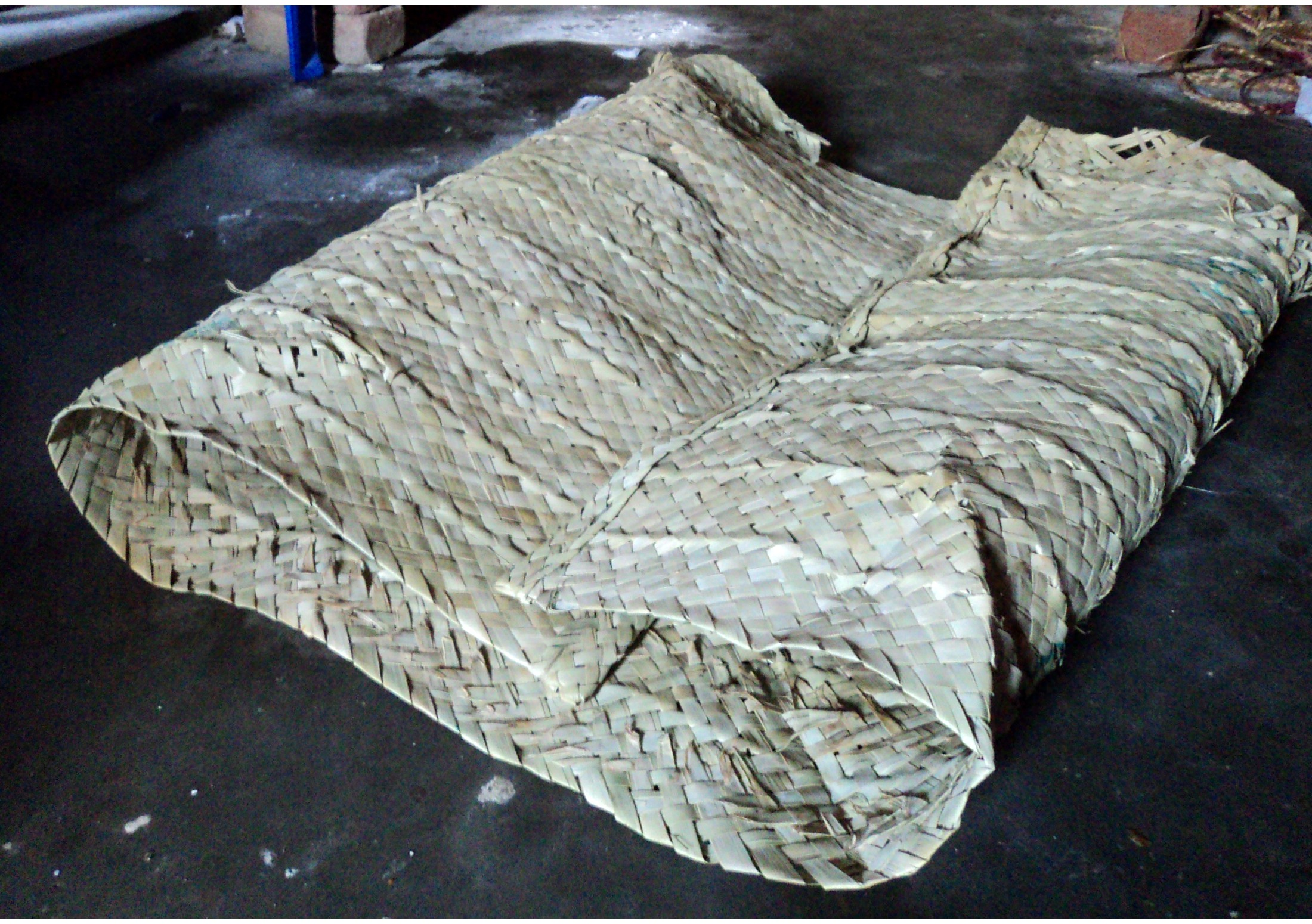
A full date leaf pati

A date palm leaf pati (Bengali: খেজুর পাতার পাটি, romanized: Khujer Patar Pati) is a traditional handmade furniture and house decoration. It was part of the cultural heritage of the village of Bengal, but fell out of use.

== Materials ==
Pati is typically made of cane, bamboo and straw. A special kind of pati, it is made of date palm tree leaves. It was mainly used by the Muslim and Hindu communities. While most Hindu mat makers were members of the Vaishnava faith, the Muslim mat makers belonged to various communities.

== Uses ==
Date palm leaf pati is typically used in Bangladesh and West Bengal in rooms for sitting and sleeping. It is used for sun drying produce. It is used for religious purposes such as Hindu wedding ceremonies. It can function as a prayer rug, Jainamaz, for Muslims.

== Construction ==
First, the branches of the date palm are cut from the tree and sun-dried. Part of the base and the front of the leaves are cut off. Afterward, the leaf is divided into two parts. Once divided, the leaf pieces are prepared to be as thin as required to make the pati. Finally, the pieces are woven, side by side, to make a full pati. The total length of pati should be normally 4–6 feet. It takes about a week to complete a full pati. A pati can incorporate various colors.

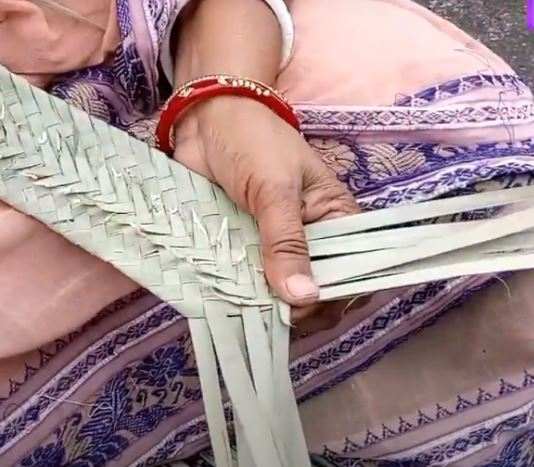
Sewing of Date Palm Leaf

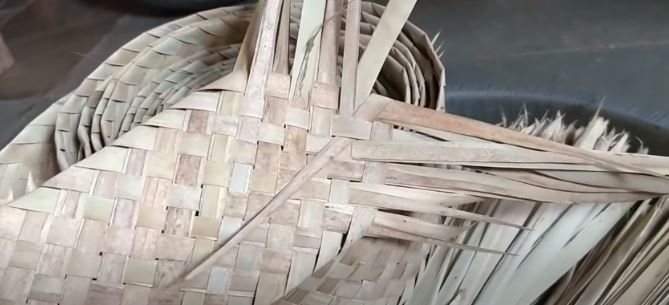
Date Palm Leaf Spiral

== Lifetime and price ==
A typical pati may last up to 12 to 18 months. The price of a pati depends on its length and the artwork applied to it. The selling price can vary from 3 to 6 USD (200-500 taka).
