= Handicrafts of Kerman =

Artworks from Kerman, Iran

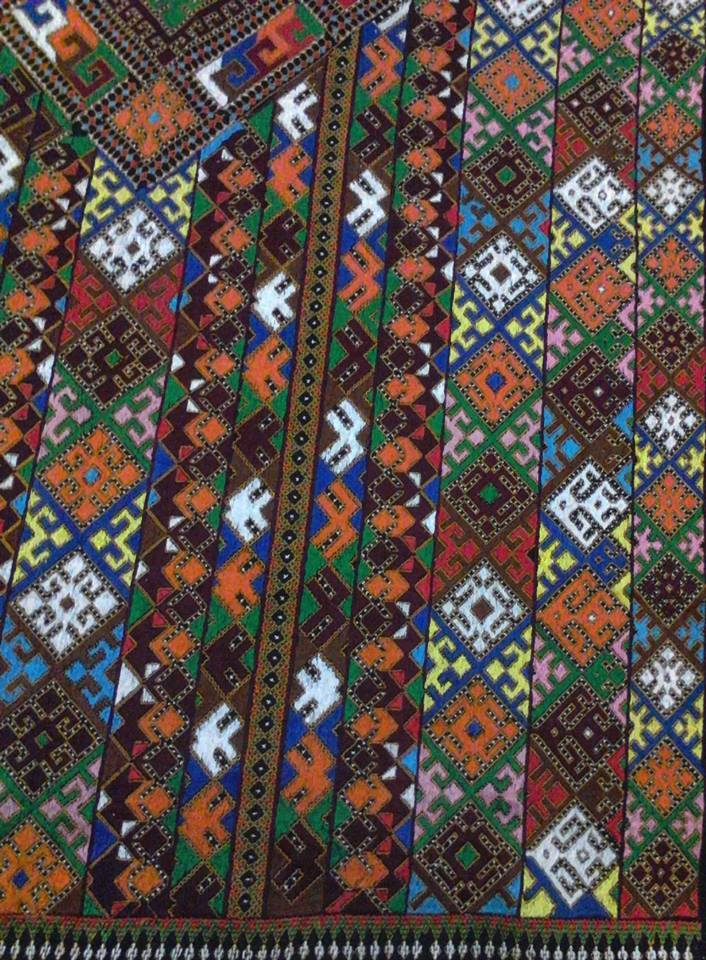

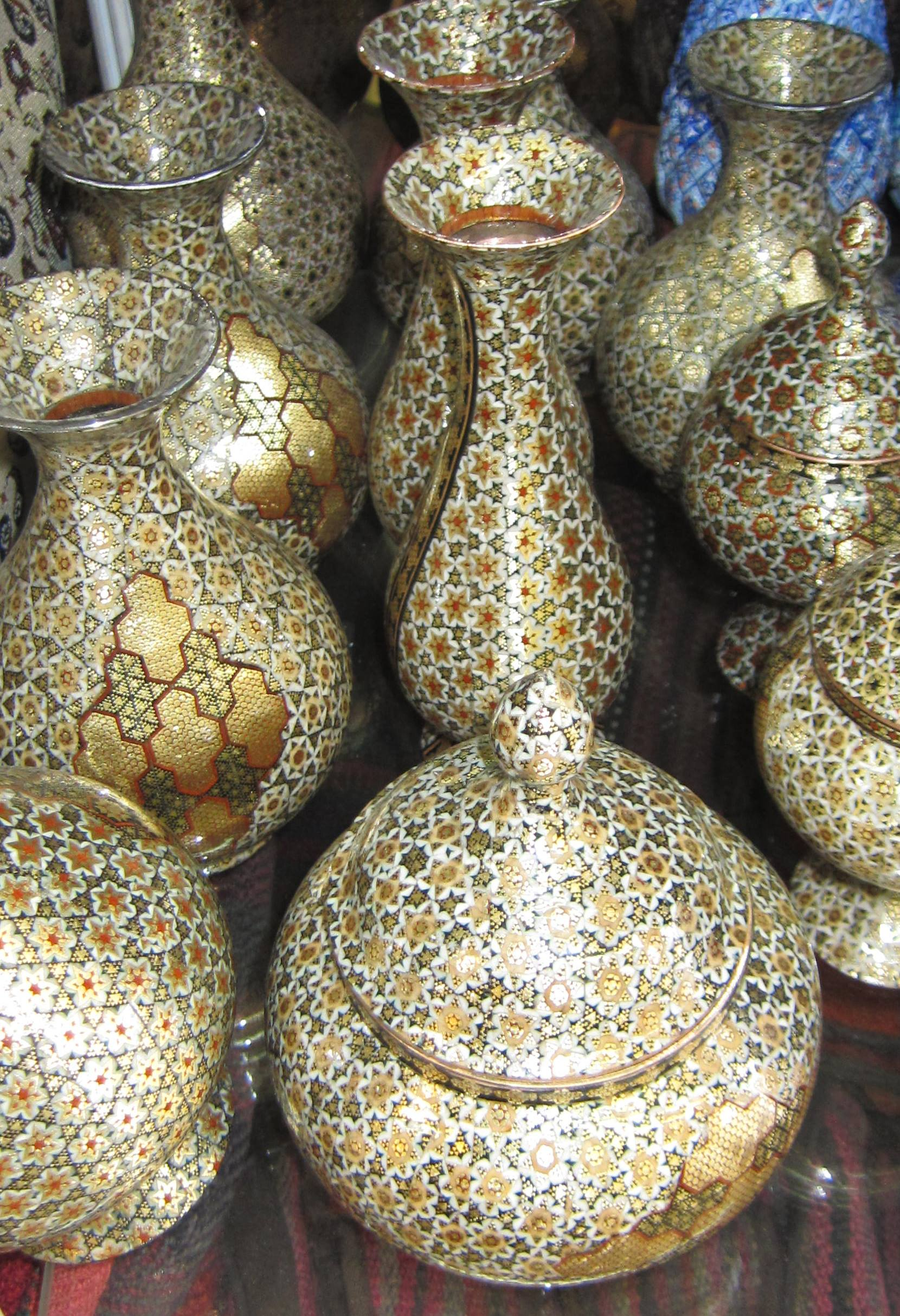

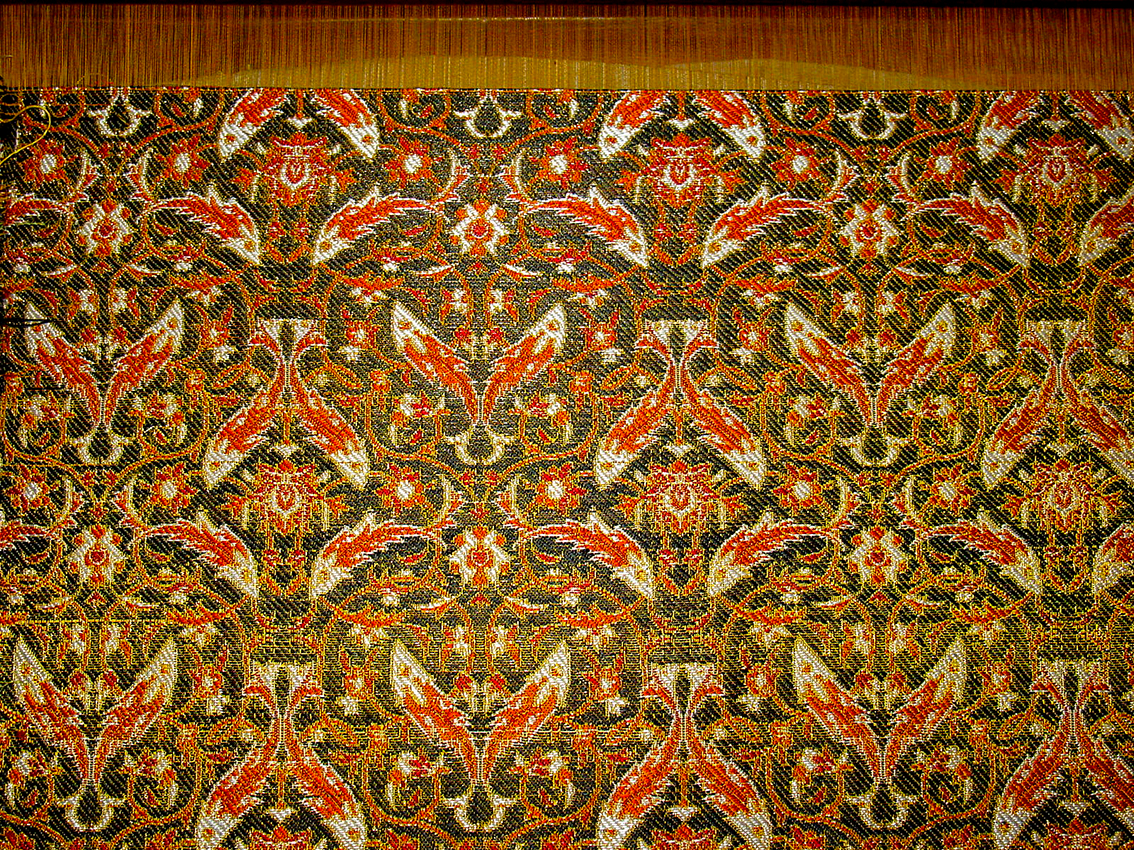

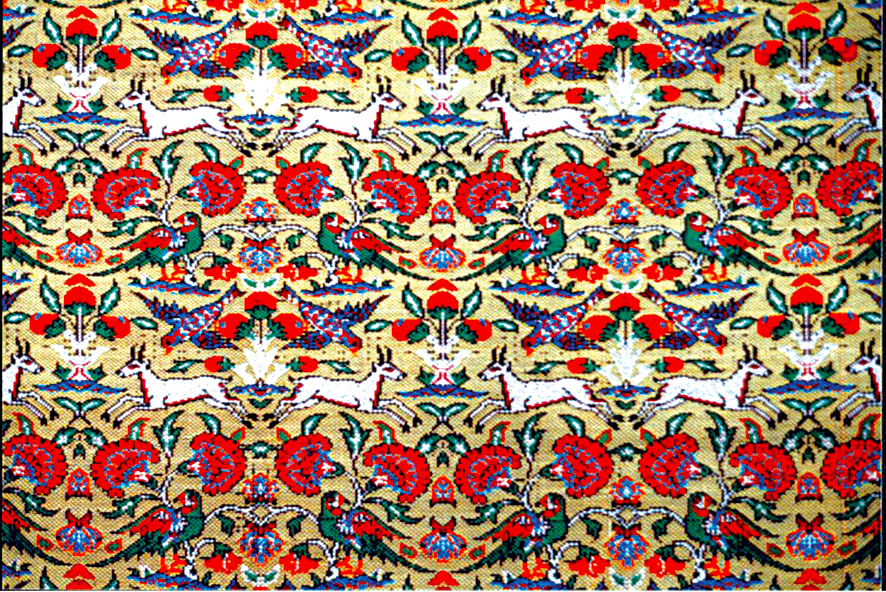

Kerman are types of traditional Iranian artwork relating to the culture and history of Iran from the province of Kerman. Handicrafts include traditional embroidery known as Pateh, carpets, fretwork on wood, jajeems (loosely woven cloth), and decorative copper knives.

Kermans have desirable wool for weaving carpets. The popularity of Kerman carpet stems from their design and color. One of the most popular types is the Ravar carpet. Pateh embroidery uses colored thread on the special cloth and used for table cloths or curtains.

- Gelim is a short, napped, coarse carpet. Most of Gelim is used by its makes in different shapes such as pannier and gelimcheh. The most popular kinds are called Shirikipich and Souzani.
- Kerman shawls had great value and were often retained as capital. In times of poverty, they were used as currency.
