= Pateh =

Iranian traditional needlework folk art

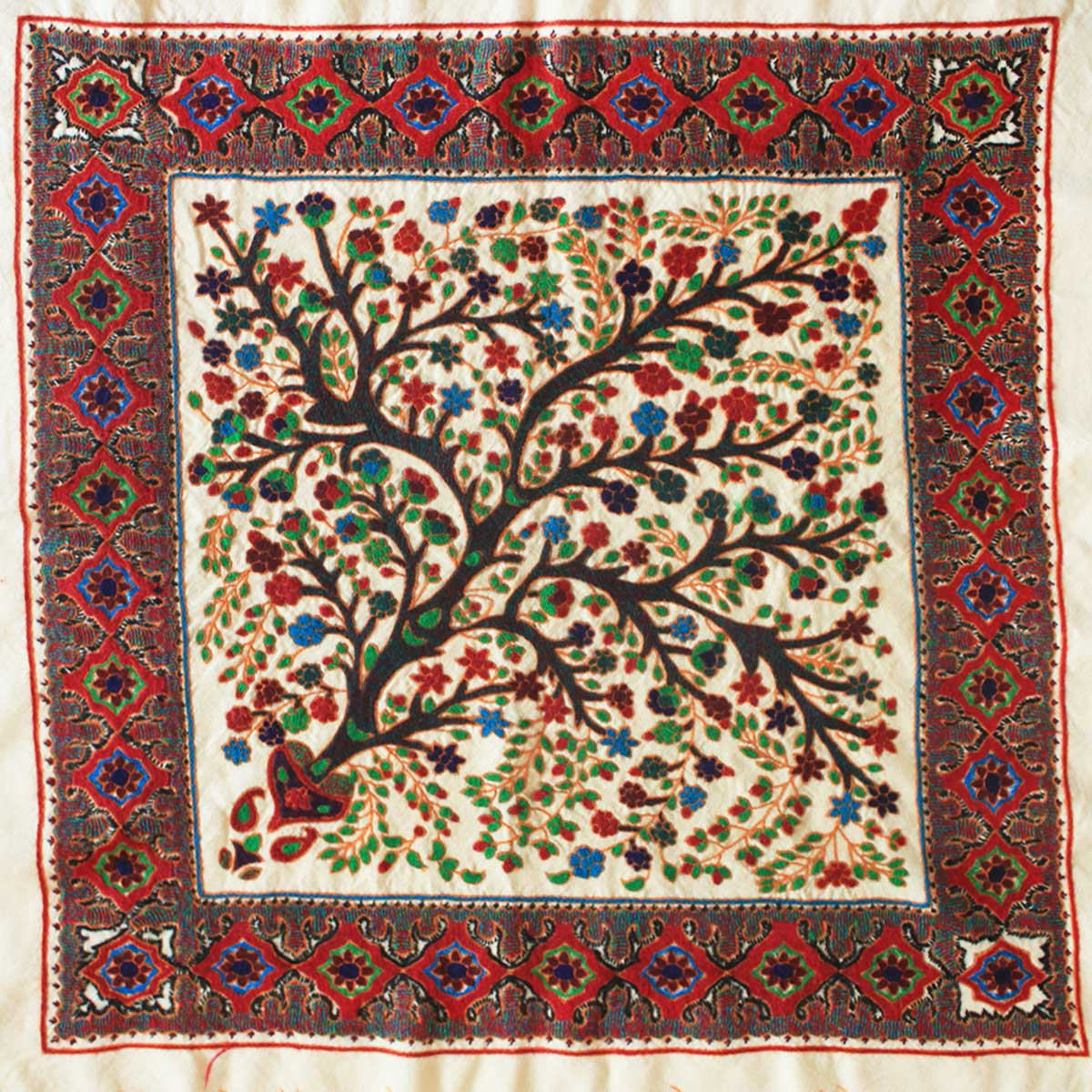
Wool pateh produced in Kerman, Iran

Pateh (Persian: پته, IPA: pæte; also Romanized as pateh) is an Iranian traditional needlework folk art. It originated in and is largely associated with Kerman province, where it is produced by women. A wide piece of wool fabric (ariz) is needleworked with colored thread.

Pateh needlework is done in silk and with flourishes of paisley patterns. Popular designs include the cypress tree and the sun, both of which are traditional Persian symbols.

== History ==
Pateh originated and developed in Kerman province. Although its exact origin is unclear, it is assumed that it was influenced by Kerman rug weaving and thus does not predate the latter. The oldest pateh known is dated to the 18th century.

Many valuable pateh pieces are held in art museums, particularly in Tehran. The oldest and most valuable pateh known is kept in the Astaneh Museum in Mahan, Kerman and dates to 1294 AH (1877 CE). It was created over the course of three years by twelve women. Governor Shahab al-Mulk ordered its creation so that it could be dedicated to the shrine of Shah Nimatullah Wali, a dervish and poet who was born in Kerman. The length of this work is 355 and its width is 210 cm, which was woven by Kermani women. In Kerman province, there are currently more than 50,000 artisans employed in this sector.

== Structure ==
Pateh mainly consists of two parts: "shawl" (ariz) and thread. The ariz is a thick cloth, usually wool, and the thread that is worked into it is colored wool. Threads are dyed naturally, usually with henna, pomegranate, madder or the walnut's green husk.

The patterns which are used in Pateh are normally divided into two main groups: "The Paisley" and "The Tree". One of the most popular patterns consists of four Paisleys on the corners and a toranj at the center. Sometimes flower bouquets are being used instead of paisley. Another common design is called mihrab in which an arch is being made on the top of the pateh. However, one of the essential parts in a design for pateh is margin which is typically filled with flowers or different kinds of paisley.

== See also ==
- Iranian handicrafts
- Handicrafts of Kerman
- Persian embroidery
- Rasht embroidery
