= Prayer rug =

Mat of fabric or carpet used during prayer

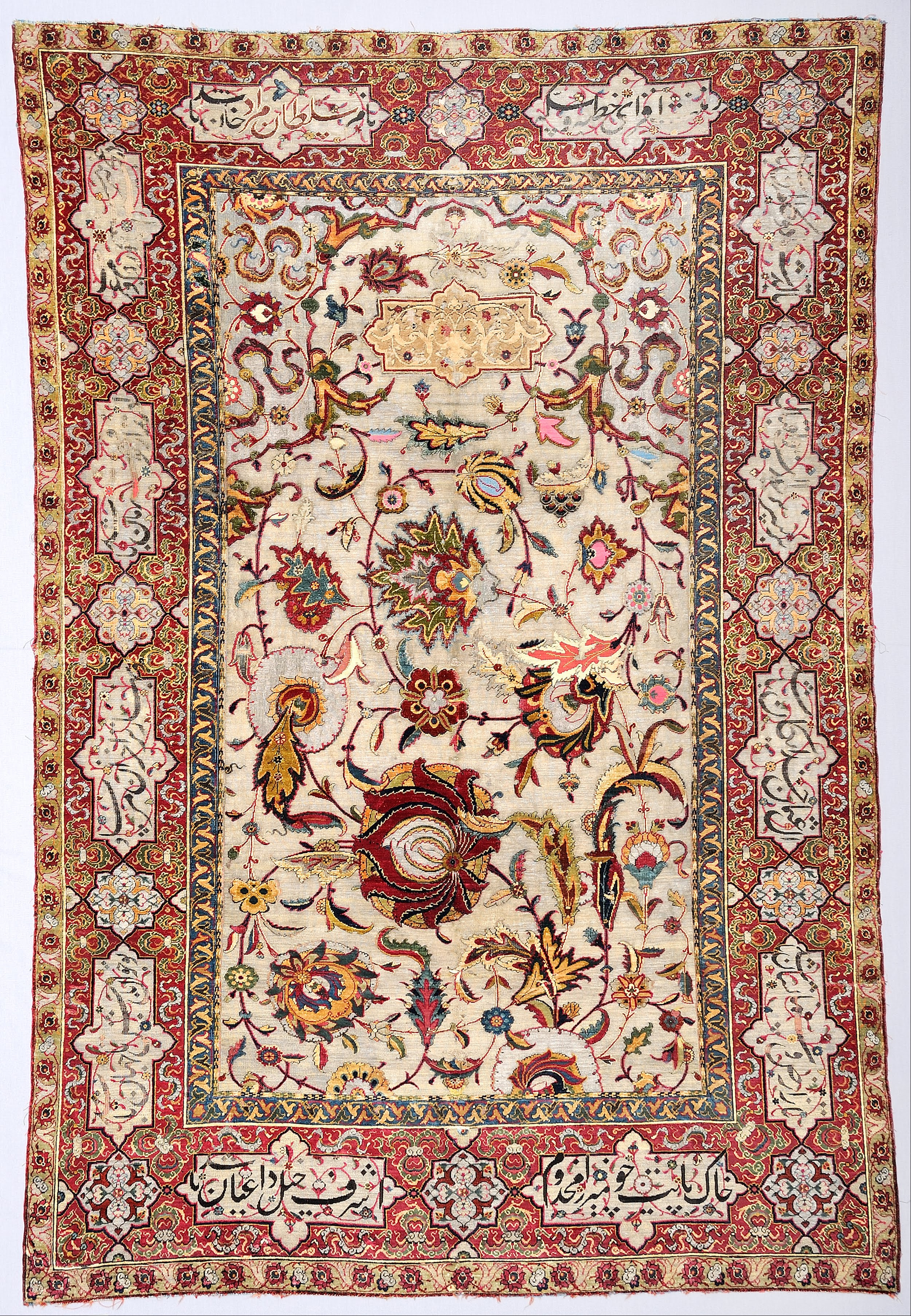
This Safavid prayer rug with a silk pile on the ground brocaded with metal threads forms part of a prestigious set of Safavid Persian Niche rugs. Most of the preserved rugs of this group were intended as diplomatic gifts from the Safavid court to the Ottomans. The poetic inscription on the border is executed in nasta`liq script, in Persian verse and includes the name of Murad III. Circa 1570-1600 CE. Museum of Islamic Art, Doha.

A prayer rug or prayer mat, also called Sajadah, is a piece of fabric, sometimes a pile carpet, used by Muslims during prayer. It is also used by some Christians, especially in Orthodox Christianity, and to a lesser extent by some denominations of Jews. In Islam, a prayer rug is placed between the ground and the worshipper for cleanliness during the various positions of Islamic prayer. These involve prostration and sitting on the ground. A Muslim must have wudu (ablution) before prayer, and must pray in a clean place.

Prayer rugs are also used by some Oriental Orthodox Christians for Christian prayer involving prostrations in the name of the Trinity, as well as during the recitation of the Alleluia and Kyrie eleison. Its purpose is to maintain a cleanly space to pray to God and shoes must be removed when using the prayer rug. Among Russian Orthodox Christians, particularly Old Ritualists, a special prayer rug known as the Podruchnik is used to keep one's face and hands clean during prostrations, as these parts of the body are used to make the sign of the cross.

Most prayer mats are manufactured by weavers in a factory. The design of a prayer mat is based on the village it came from and its weaver. These rugs are usually decorated with many beautiful geometric patterns and shapes. They are sometimes even decorated with images. These images are usually important Islamic sites, such as the Kaaba, Imam Husayn Shrine or Imam Reza Shrine, but they are never animate objects. This is because the drawing of animate objects on Islamic prayer mats is forbidden.

For Muslims, when praying, a niche, representing the mihrab of a mosque, at the top of the mat must be pointed to the qibla (Mecca). All Muslims are required to know the qibla or direction towards Mecca from their home or where they are while traveling. Oriental Orthodox Christians position their prayer rugs so that they face east, the direction of prayer towards which they offer prayer.

== History and use ==
=== In Judaism ===
Prayer rugs are used in some Jewish communities. In the US they are most commonly seen today in the Karaite community. However, they were used daily or with a similar frequency by Sephardi and Mizrahi Jews historically. Ashkenazi Jews use them less often, as prostration and kneeling is less common during prayers (mainly happening on Yom Kippur). Some Mizrahim still use prayer rugs, but this has fallen out of common practice in some communities, likely due to Ashkenazi influence. This influence has even impacted some Karaites. In Hebrew these rugs are called yeriah, a term also used for the curtains and tent hangings of the Mishkan. Abraham Maimonides was a promoter of the practice of prostration and kneeling, but disliked the use of padded prayer rugs and poufs for kneeling. This was likely due to the fact that he promoted it as an ascetic, Sufi influenced custom (his view was that Sufis had preserved customs of Jews from the time just after and before the Temple was destroyed), so padding detracted from the purpose. There are varying halachic opinions on the use of prayer rugs, with some rabbis viewing them as originally pagan and therefore prohibited, but Rambam permits them, and they are required to be used during prostration and kneeling. If one does not use a rug, towel, etc, one cannot prostrate, especially on a stone floor- to do so is seen as an imitation of Temple practice that was prohibited, of potentially being a practice related to idolatry, and there are some questions about the ritual purity of rugs.

It is possible that prostration and kneeling (and therefore, prayer rugs) were a more common, perhaps daily Jewish practice in antiquity. The phrase "fall on (ones) face" may refer to prostration or kneeling as a custom when encountering the divine that would have been an appropriate attitude for prayer. Some Rabbinic Jews, such as Chabad, have the stance that prostration during daily prayer is prohibited.

=== In Christianity ===
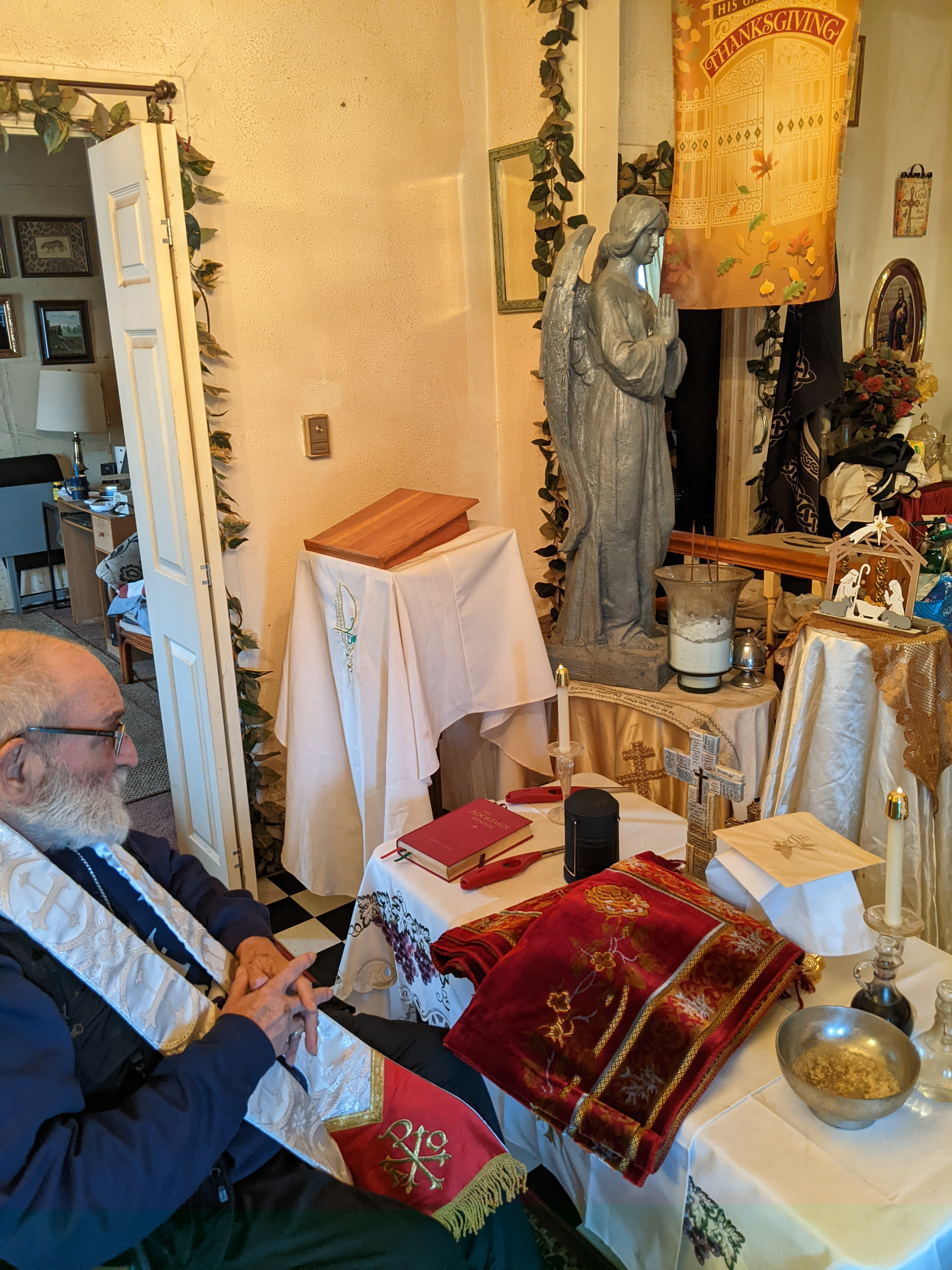
A Western Orthodox hieromonk blesses prayer rugs to be used for Christian prayer at fixed prayer times.

Prayer rugs are used in some traditions of Oriental Orthodox Christianity and Western Orthodox Christianity (though this is not common), to provide a clean space for believers to offer Christian prayers to God.

During the seven fixed prayer times of Oriental Orthodox Christians, believers incorporate prostrations in the praying of the canonical hours that are performed facing east, with Copts "prostrating three times in the name of the Trinity; at the end of each Psalm [...] while saying the 'Alleluia'; and multiple times during the more than forty Kyrie eleisons" (cf. Agpeya). Indian Orthodox Christians prostrate thrice during the Qauma prayer, at the words "Crucified for us, Have mercy on us!", thrice during the recitation of the Nicene Creed at the words "And was incarnate of the Holy Spirit...", "And was crucified for us...", and "And on the third day rose again...", as well as thrice during the Prayer of the Cherubim while praying the words "Blessed is the glory of the Lord, from His place forever!" (cf. Shehimo). These prayer rugs are often blessed by Christian clergy in the church before ever being used; in this way, when a Christian prays at home, it is as if they are praying in their local church. Additionally, carpets cover the floors of parishes in denominations such as the Ethiopian Orthodox Tewahedo Church on which Christians prostrate in prayer. Among Russian Orthodox Old Ritualists, a special prayer rug known as the Podruchnik is used to keep one's face and hands clean during prostrations, as these parts of the body are used to make the sign of the cross. In the Middle East and South Asia, where Christian missionaries are engaged in evangelism, some converts to Christianity use prayer rugs for prayer and worship in order to preserve their Eastern cultural context. In modern times, among most adherents of Western Christianity, kneelers placed in pews (for corporate worship) or in prie-dieus (for private worship) are customary; historically however, prayer rugs were used by some Christian monks to pray the canonical hours in places such as Syria, Northumbria, and Ireland well before the arrival of Islam.

The Armenian Apostolic Church, an Oriental Orthodox Christian denomination, has a long tradition of prayer rugs with Christian symbols woven in them; these have been found in places as far as Shirvan. One of the oldest is the Saint Hrip'sime Rug, which was woven in 1202 A.D. and originates in the village of Banants, located in what is now Gandja.

=== In Islam ===
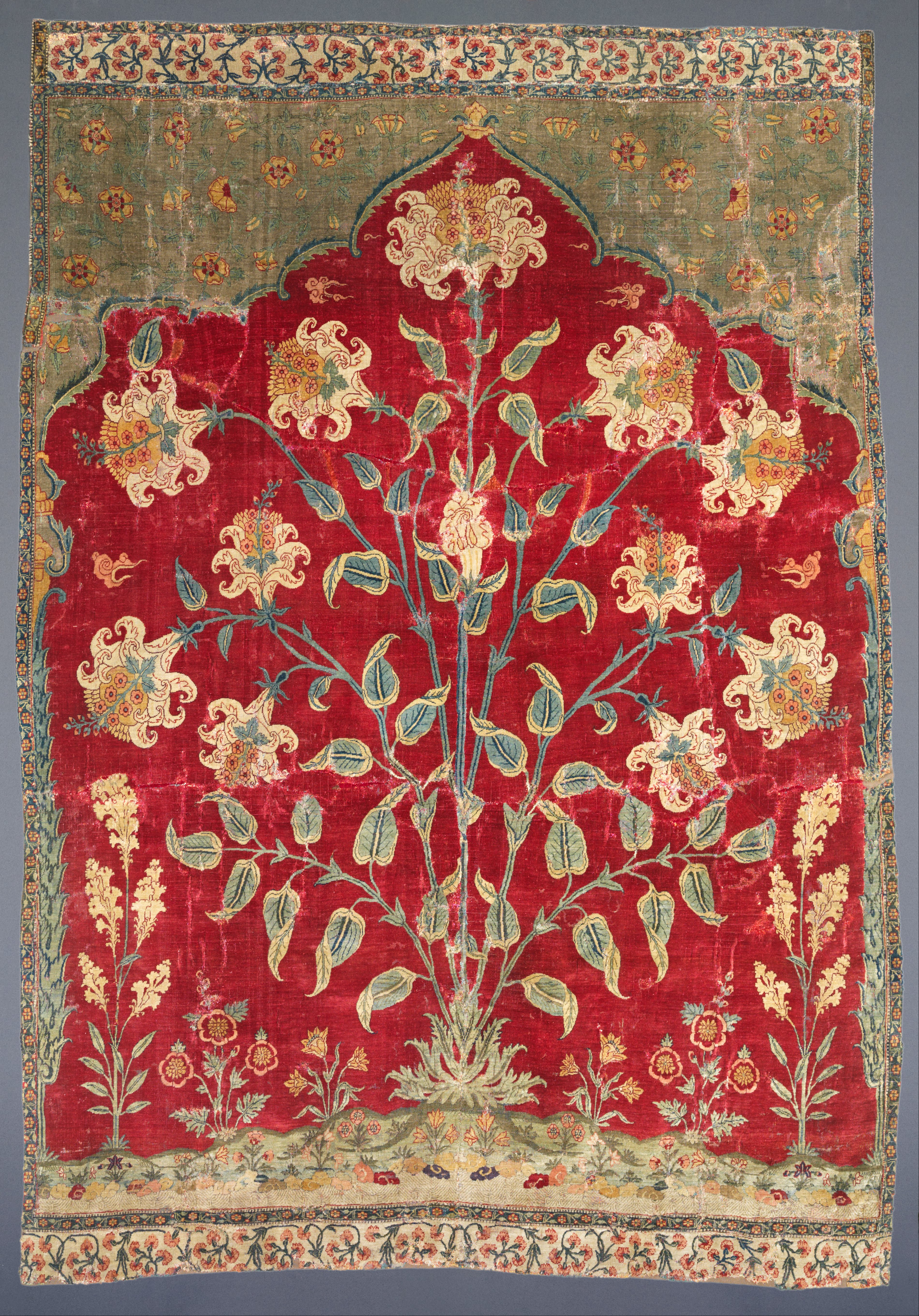
Fragment of a saf carpet. Mughal India, first half of the 17th century. Museum of Islamic Art, Doha

==== Significance ====
While not explicitly mandated in the Quran or Ḥadīt̲h, prayer rugs, known in one source as sad̲j̲d̲j̲āda, are nonetheless deeply embedded in Islamic practice and material culture. They represent a physical and symbolic delineation of sacred space, allowing the worshiper to create a ritually pure area for prayer. The presence of the miḥrāb—a stylized representation of the prayer niche found in mosques—visually orients the individual towards the Kaaba in Mecca, the direction Muslims face during prayer. Prayer rugs, particularly those from the Safavid and Qajar periods, offer a window into broader cultural and intellectual trends in the Islamic world. During the Safavid era, prayer rug designs emphasized explicitly Islamic themes and specifically Shi'a Islam, with inscriptions reinforcing religious identity. Conversely, Qajar prayer rugs reflect a growing focus on the individual, with patron's names, images of kings and heroes, and motifs inspired by contact with the West, signaling a shift in the understanding of the rug's purpose and meaning. Ultimately, the prayer rug, while a simple object in form, embodies the connection between the material and the spiritual, the individual and the communal, and historical trends and artistic expression in the Islamic world.

==== Background ====
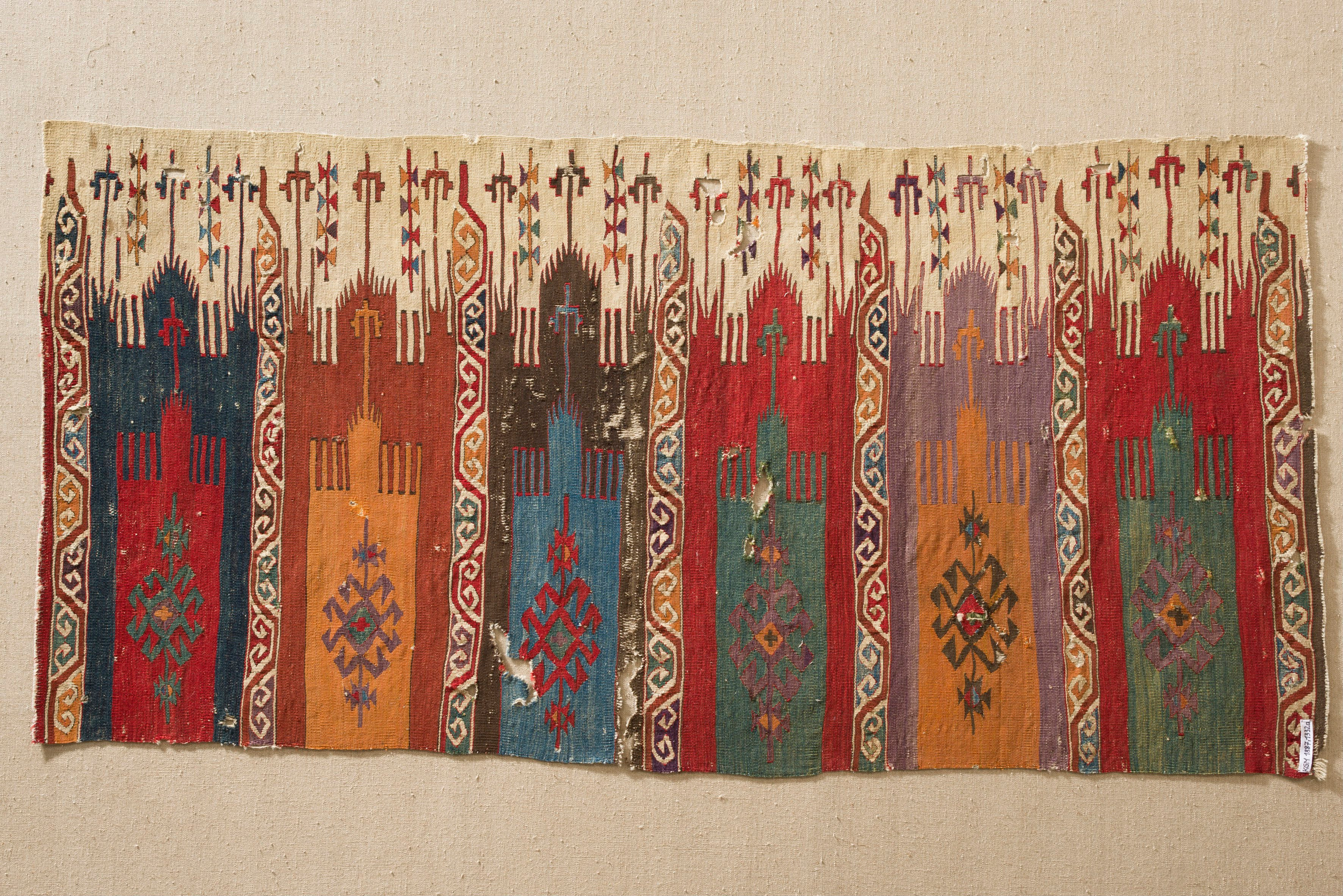
A row niche kilim of a saf kind, laid out in mosques to give room to several worshipers next to each other. Turkey, 18th century. Museum of Islamic Art, Berlin

In Islamic world there are two basic types of prayer rug, one designed with a single mihrab and meant for individual worship, the other with multiple niches and intended for a place of public prayer such as a mosque. This second type is known as saf.

A prayer rug is characterized by a niche at one end, representing the mihrab in every mosque. The mihrab represents not just the direction of prayer but also a gateway to the divine or a symbolic connection to the mosque architecture. Many rugs also show one or more mosque lamps, a reference to the Verse of Light in the Qur'an. Additionally, the use of floral and tree motifs, particularly the tree of life, can be linked to concepts of paradise, eternity, and immortality. Occasionally, prayer rugs depict specific mosques, such as those in Mecca, Medina, and Jerusalem, further emphasizing the symbolic connection between the prayer rug and the physical space of the mosque as a place of communal worship. After the advent of Islam, Muslims often depicted the Kaaba in order to distinguish themselves from Christian carpets. Decorations not only play a role in imagery but serve the worshipper as aids to memory. Some of the examples include a comb and pitcher, which is a reminder for Muslims to wash their hands and for men to comb their hair before performing prayer.

Prayer rugs are typically produced in the towns or villages where they are used, reflecting local weaving traditions and cultural aesthetics. The exact pattern will vary greatly by original weavers and the different materials used. Some may have patterns, dyes and materials that are traditional to the region in which they were made. The varied patterns, dyes, and materials used in prayer rugs reflect not only regional aesthetics but also the desire to create a sensory experience that enhances the act of prayer. During prayer, the individual kneels at the base of the rug and performs sud̲j̲ūd, prostrating with their forehead, nose, hands, knees, and toes touching the ground, towards the niche representing the direction of Mecca.

==== Regional variations of prayer rugs ====
Using some type of floor covering for prayer was known early in Islamic history. Though there is evidence that carpets may have been produced in Anatolia before Turkish invasions in the 11th century, no examples survive. The oldest surviving prayer rugs, discovered in mosques in Konya and Beyşehir, are believed to be from the 14th century, and were woven entirely of wool with geometric designs. From the 14th century onward, European paintings increasingly depict Anatolian prayer rugs that were exported to Europe, leading to the use of European painter's names to classify prayer rug types.

The design of prayer rug varies in different regions. Turkish prayer rugs are known for their balanced geometric patterns and floral elements. Persian rugs, in contrast, often display a more graceful aesthetic with elegant miḥrābs and realistic floral decorations. The “Tree of Life” is another common motif in Persian rugs, sometimes incorporated within the miḥrāb.

Indian prayer rug traditions highlight the intersection of religious and cultural influences. While pile-woven carpets and prayer rugs gained popularity during the Mughal period, the region also has a long tradition of using darī, flat-woven cotton rugs. The 18th-century cotton prayer rugs from Bīd̲j̲āpūr, with their floral patterns and uniquely Indian domed minarets rising from the miḥrāb, show this cultural fusion.

Weaving styles for the prayer rugs also differed greatly along with patterns and designs between the regions. The Anatolian Ottomans mainly used a symmetrical (Ghiordes) knot, a technique which helped with the geometric pattern style of that region. The symmetrical knot style also helped with creating the rugs thicker and more durable.

The Persians on the other hand used the style called the Asymmetrical Persian (Senneh) knot. The Senneh style allowed for fine details, providing with the graceful and floral patterns as seen in the Persian prayer rugs.

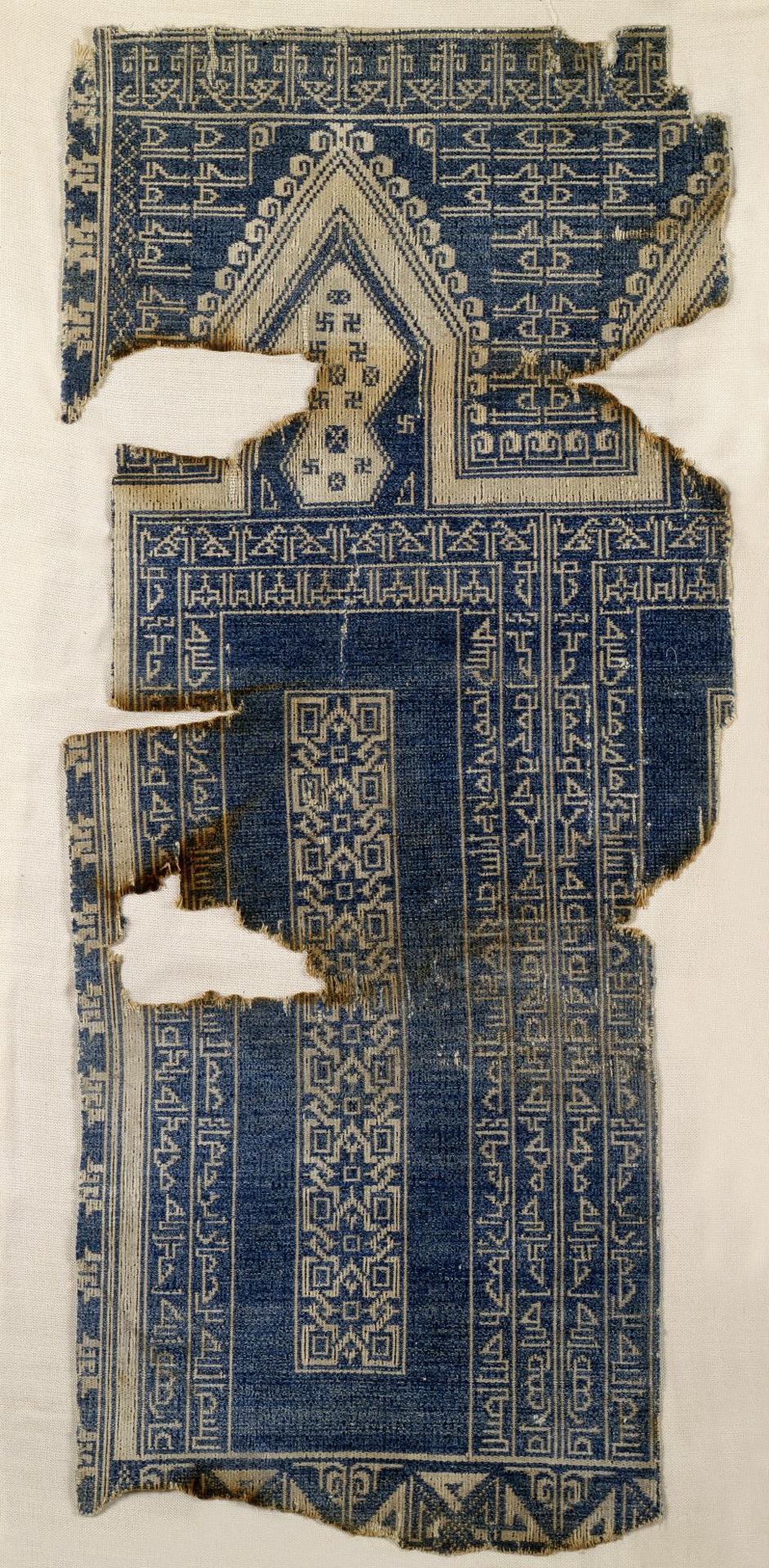
Fragment of a flat-weave (zilu) saf carpet. Dated to the first half of the 14th century, it is the earliest extant example of a flat-weaven carpet from Islamic Iran. Hermitage Museum

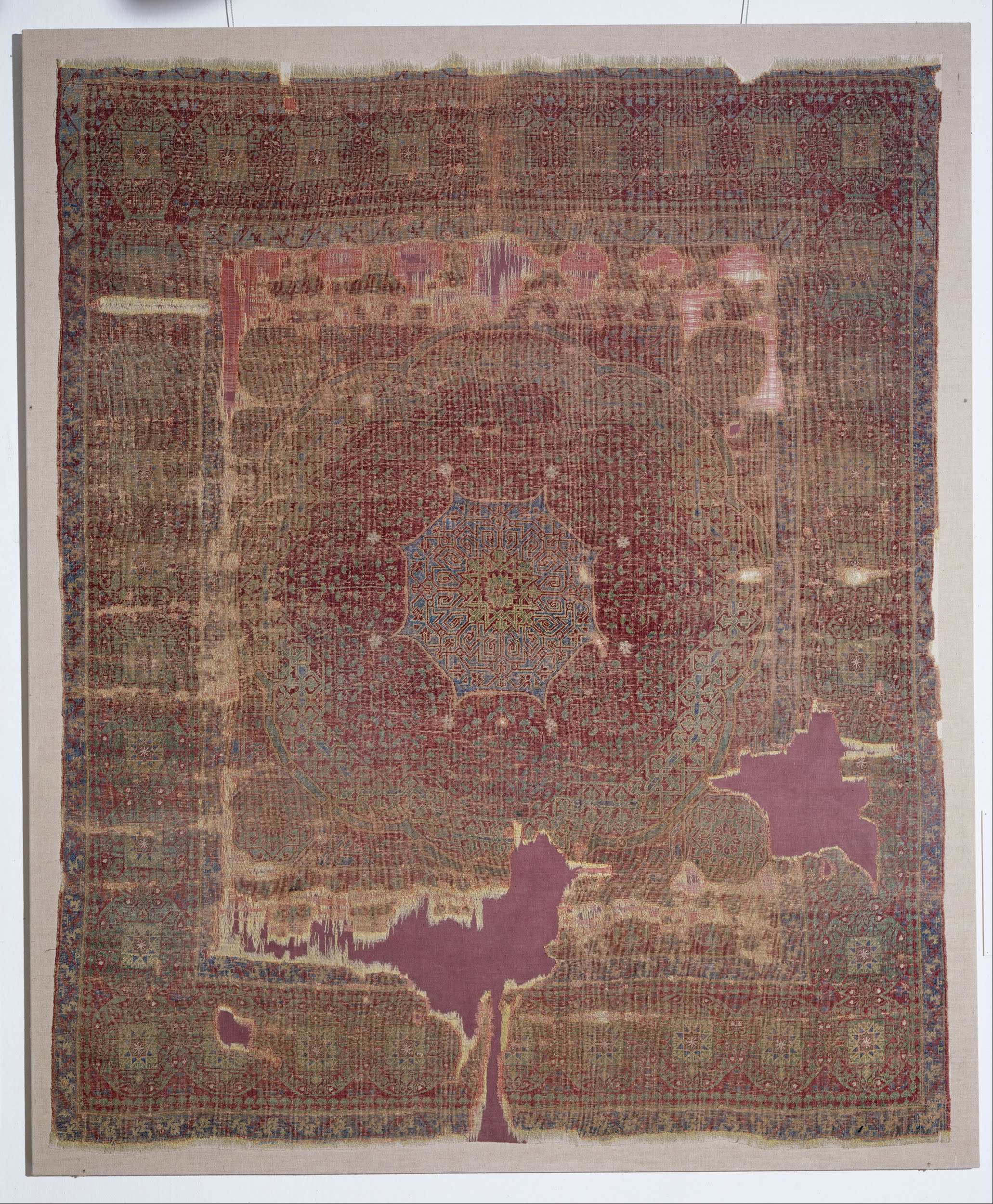
Mamluk prayer rug. c. 1500. Museum of Islamic Art, Berlin

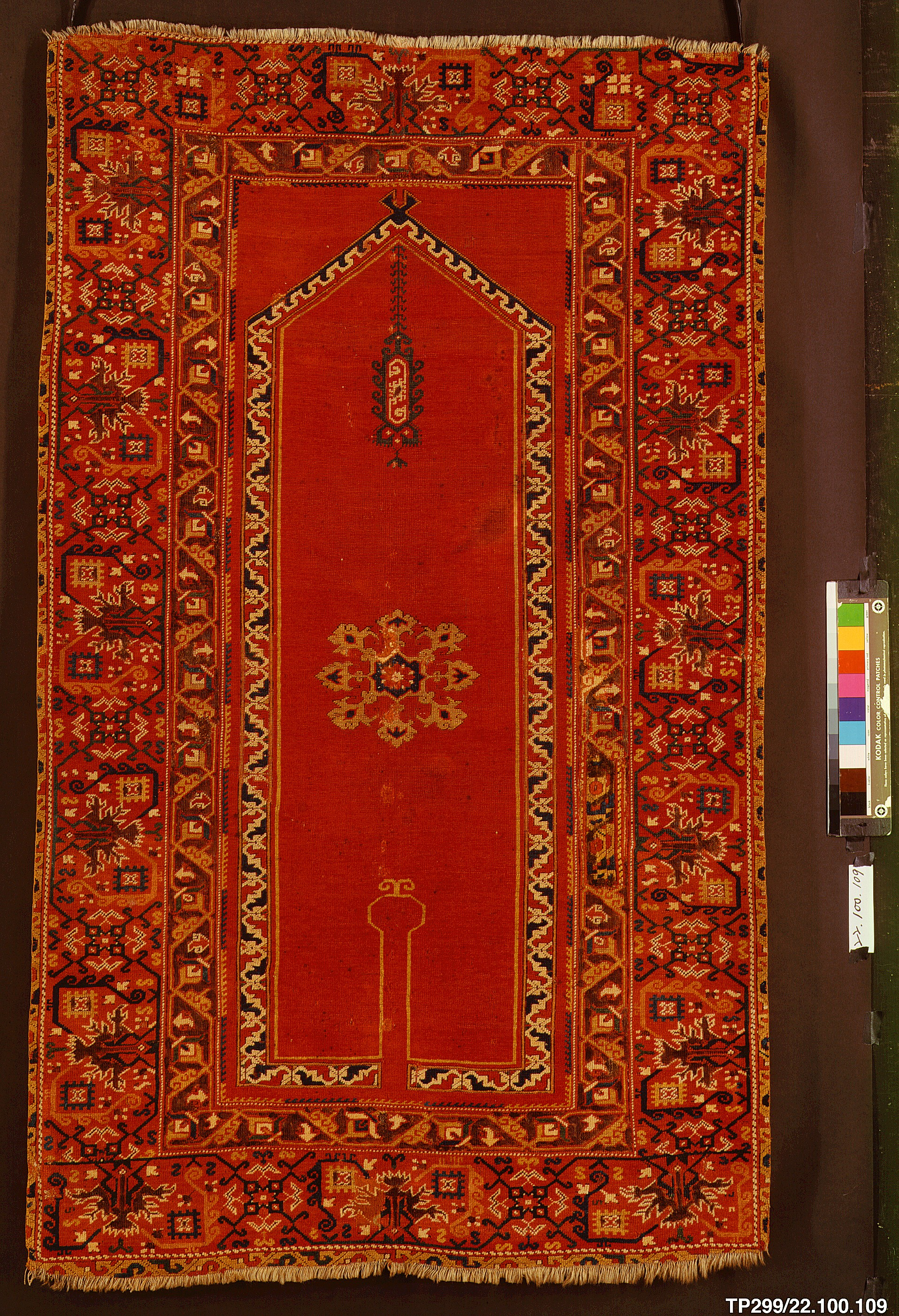
"Re-entrant" or "keyhole" prayer mat, also called a Bellini carpet, Anatolia, late 15th to early 16th century. The mat symbolically describes the environment of a mosque, with the entrance (the "keyhole"), and the mihrab (the forward corner) with its hanging mosque lamps. Metropolitan Museum of Art

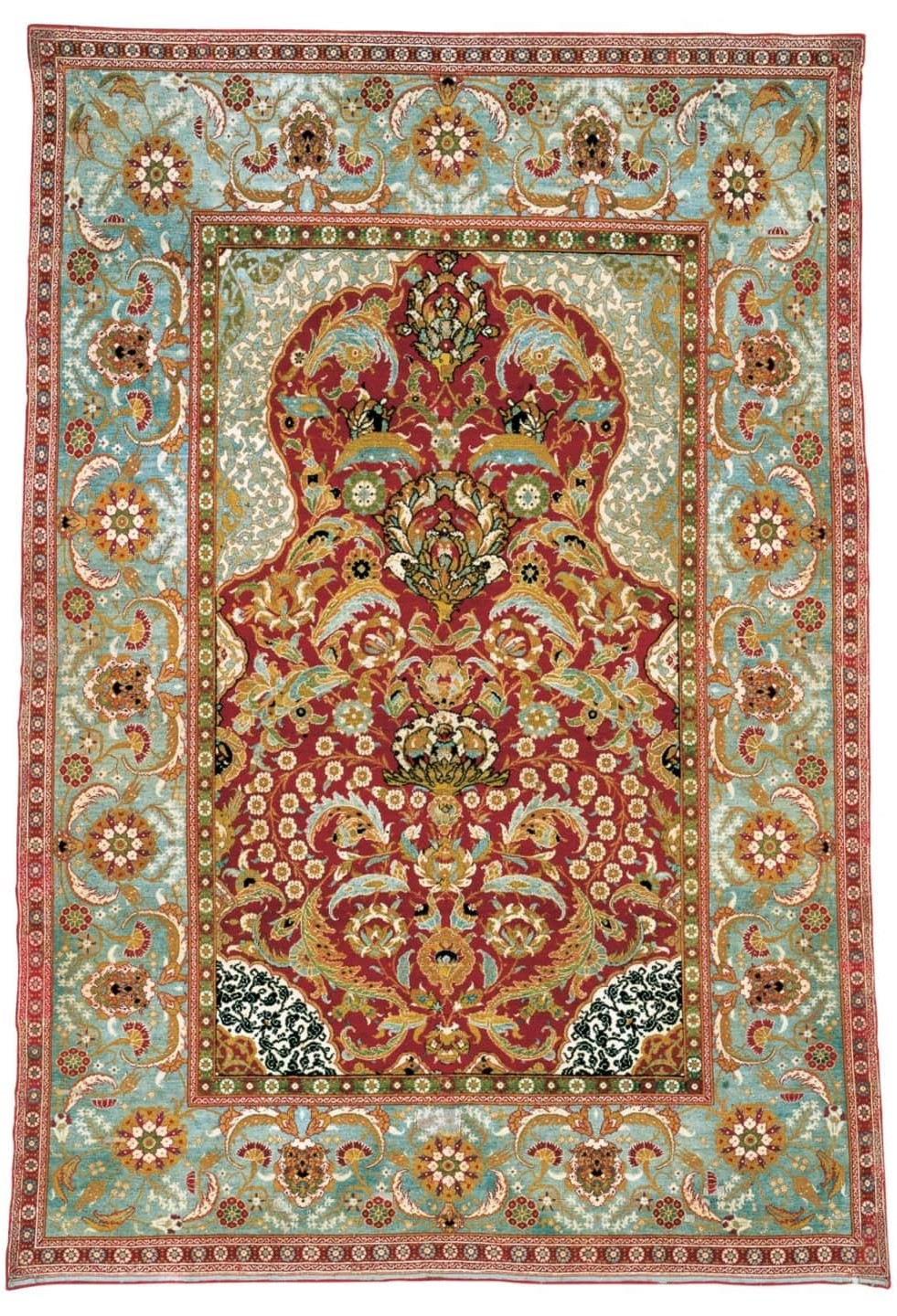
Niche prayer carpet. Turkey, 2nd half of the 16th century. Museum of Applied Arts, Vienna

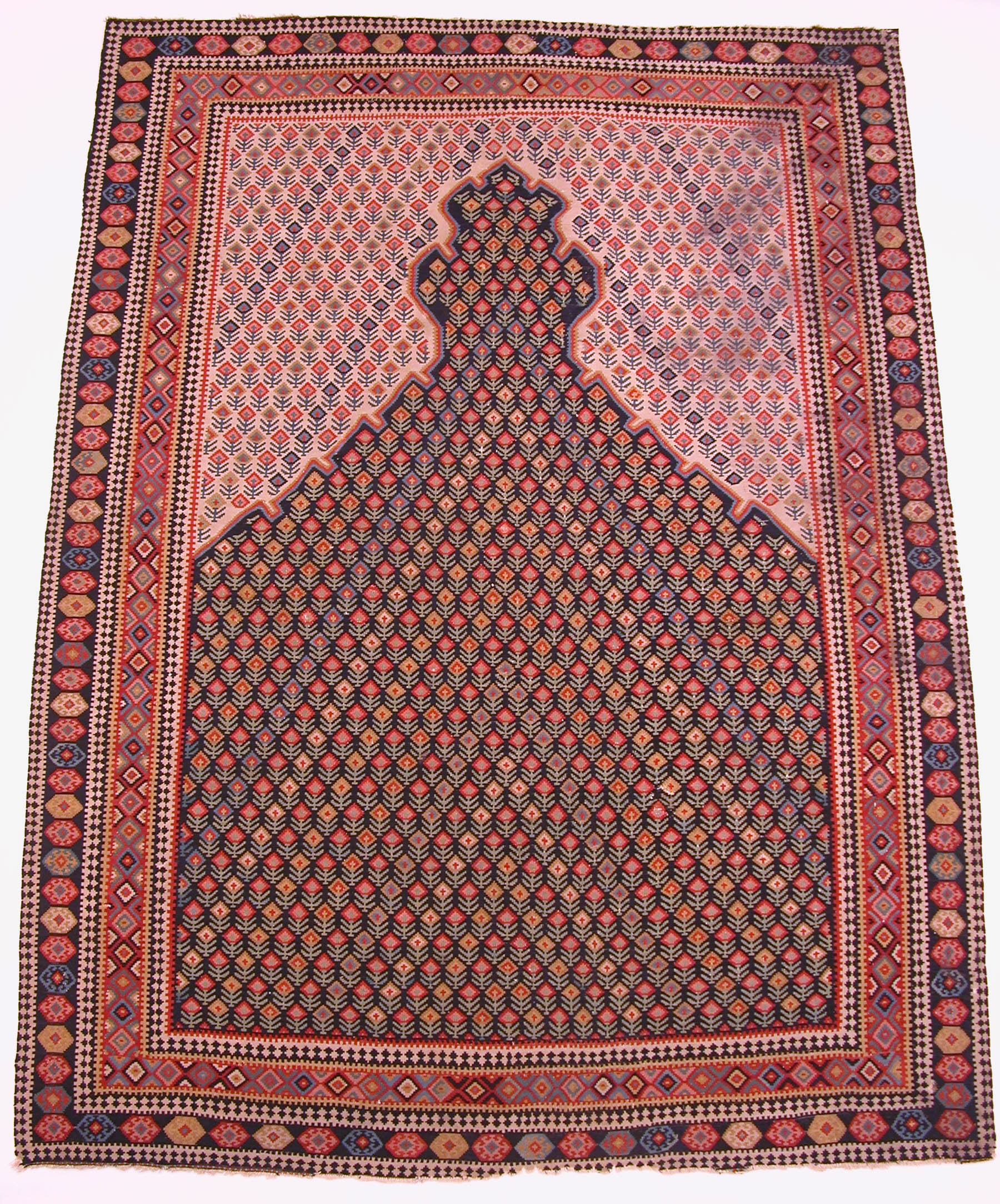
"Senneh" prayer rug. Sanandaj, late 18th–early 19th century. Metropolitan Museum of Art

==== Interactive prayer mats ====
Interactive prayer mats, also known as smart prayer mats or digital prayer rugs, are a recent development in the field of prayer rugs. These mats are designed to enhance the spiritual experience of Muslims during prayer by incorporating technology into the traditional practice of prayer, and for educational purposes.

Many children and new reverts use the interactive prayer mats as a guide to learn Islamic prayer, helping them through telling the sequence and positions of the various prayers according to the time of the day. Most smart rugs include audio recitation and appropriately illustrated prayer positions, making praying accessible to a wider range of Muslims.

=== In the Baháʼí Faith ===
In the Baháʼí Faith, prayer rugs or prayer mats are not required, though may sometimes be used as a way to fulfill the instruction written in the Baháʼí mother-book The Most Holy Book mentioning to "prostrate yourselves on any surface that is clean".

=== Islamic rugs in Lutheran Churches ===
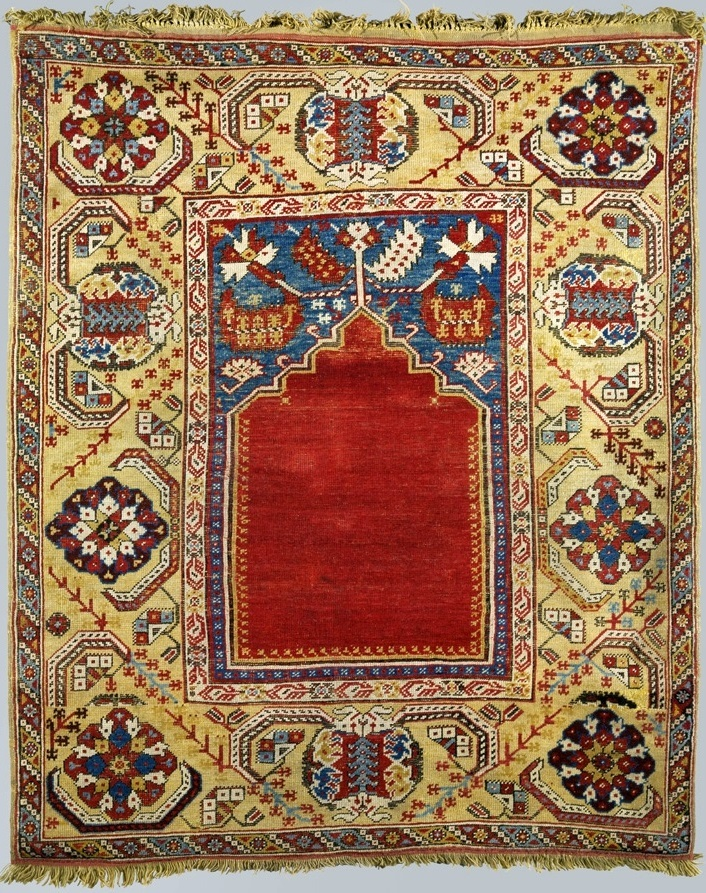
Ottoman niche prayer rug. 18th century. National Museum, Warsaw

The Saxon Lutheran Churches, parish storerooms and museums of Transylvania safeguard about four hundred Anatolian rugs, dating from the late-15th to early 18th century. They form the richest and best-preserved corpus of prayer-format rugs of Ottoman period outside Turkey.

Transylvania, like the other Romanian principalities of Moldavia and Wallachia, did not directly come under the Turkish fold. Until 1699 it had the status of an autonomous Principality, maintaining the Christian religion and own administration but paying tribute to the Ottoman Porte. By contrast, following the Battle of Mohacs in 1526, part of Hungary was designated a Pashalik and was Turkish territory for over a century and a half.

Rugs came into the ownership of the Reformed Churches, mainly as pious donations from parishioners, benefactors or guilds. In the 16th century, with the coming of the Reformation, the number of figurative images inside the churches was drastically reduced. Frescoes were white-washed or destroyed, and the many sumptuous winged altar-pieces were removed maintaining exclusively the main altar piece. The recently converted parishioners thus perceived the church as a large, cold and empty space, which required at least some decoration. Traces of the mural decoration were found during modern restorations in some Protestant Churches as for instance at Malâncrav.

In this situation the Oriental rugs, created in a world that was spiritually different from Christianity, found their place in the Reformed churches which were to become their main custodians. The removal from the commercial circuit and the fact that they were used to decorate the walls, the pews and the balconies but not on the floor was crucial for their conservation over the years.

After the Siege of Vienna of 1682 the Ottomans suffered several defeats by hand of the Habsburg army. In 1687 the rulers of Transylvania recognized the suzerainty of the Habsburg emperor Leopold I. Generally the end of Turkish rule in Transylvania is associated with the Peace Treaty of 1699, but in fact this happened more than a decade earlier. The last decades of the 17th century marked a decline of the rug trade between Transylvania and Turkey which affected carpet production in Anatolia. Shortly after the turn of the century, commercial rugs based on Lotto, Bird or Transylvanian patterns ceased to be woven.

== Name variations ==
| Region/country | Language | Main |
|---|---|---|
| Arab World | Arabic | سجادة الصلاة سجاجيد الصلاة (Sajjādat aṣ-ṣalāt), pl. سجاجيد الصلاة (Sajājīd aṣ-ṣalāt) |
| Greater Iran | Persian | جانماز (Jānamāz) |
| North India, Pakistan, Deccan | Hindi, Urdu | जानमाज़ / جا نماز (Jaa-namaaz) सजदागाह / سجدہ گاہ (Sajda-gaah) |
| Pashtunistan | Pashto | د لمانځه پوزی (Da lmanza pozi) |
| Bangladesh, West Bengal | Bengali | জায়নামাজ/জায়নামায (Jāynamāz) |
| Bosnia | Bosnian | sedžada, serdžada, postećija |
| Indonesia | Indonesian, Basa Jawa, Basa Sunda | Sajadah |
| Malaysia | Malay | Sejadah |
| Senegal, Gambia, Mauritania | Wolof | Sajadah |
| Nigeria, Niger, Ghana, Cameroon | Hausa | Buzu na salla, dadduma, darduma |
| South Kalimantan | Banjar | Pasahapan |
| Iraqi Kurdistan | Sorani | بەرماڵ (Barmāl) |
| Kazakhstan, Kyrgyzstan | Kazakh, Kyrgyz | Жайнамаз (Jainamaz) |
| Uzbekistan | Uzbek | Joynamoz |
| Greater Somalia | Somali | sijayad, salli, Sajadat |
| Turkey, Azerbaijan | Turkish, Azeri | Seccade, canamaz, namazlık |
| Pakistan | Punjabi | مُسلّه Musalla |
| Turkmenistan | Turkmen | Namazlyk |
| Kerala | Malayalam | നിസ്കാരപ്പടം, Niskarappadam |

== See also ==
- Eagle rug
- My Salah Mat
- Islamic art
- Oriental carpets in Renaissance painting
- Persian embroidery
- Podruchnik, a cushion for worshipper's hands among Russian Old Believer Christians
- Tradition of removing shoes in the home and houses of worship
- Turbah, a piece of clay or stone commonly used in Shia Islam as a place of prostration, often placed over a prayer rug

== Bibliography ==
- Linda Komaroff; Stefano Carboni (2002). The Legacy of Genghis Khan. Courtly Art and Culture in Western Asia, 1256-1353. Yale University Press. ISBN 0-300-09691-7.
