= Kerman carpet =

Style of Persian carpet named after region in south central Iran

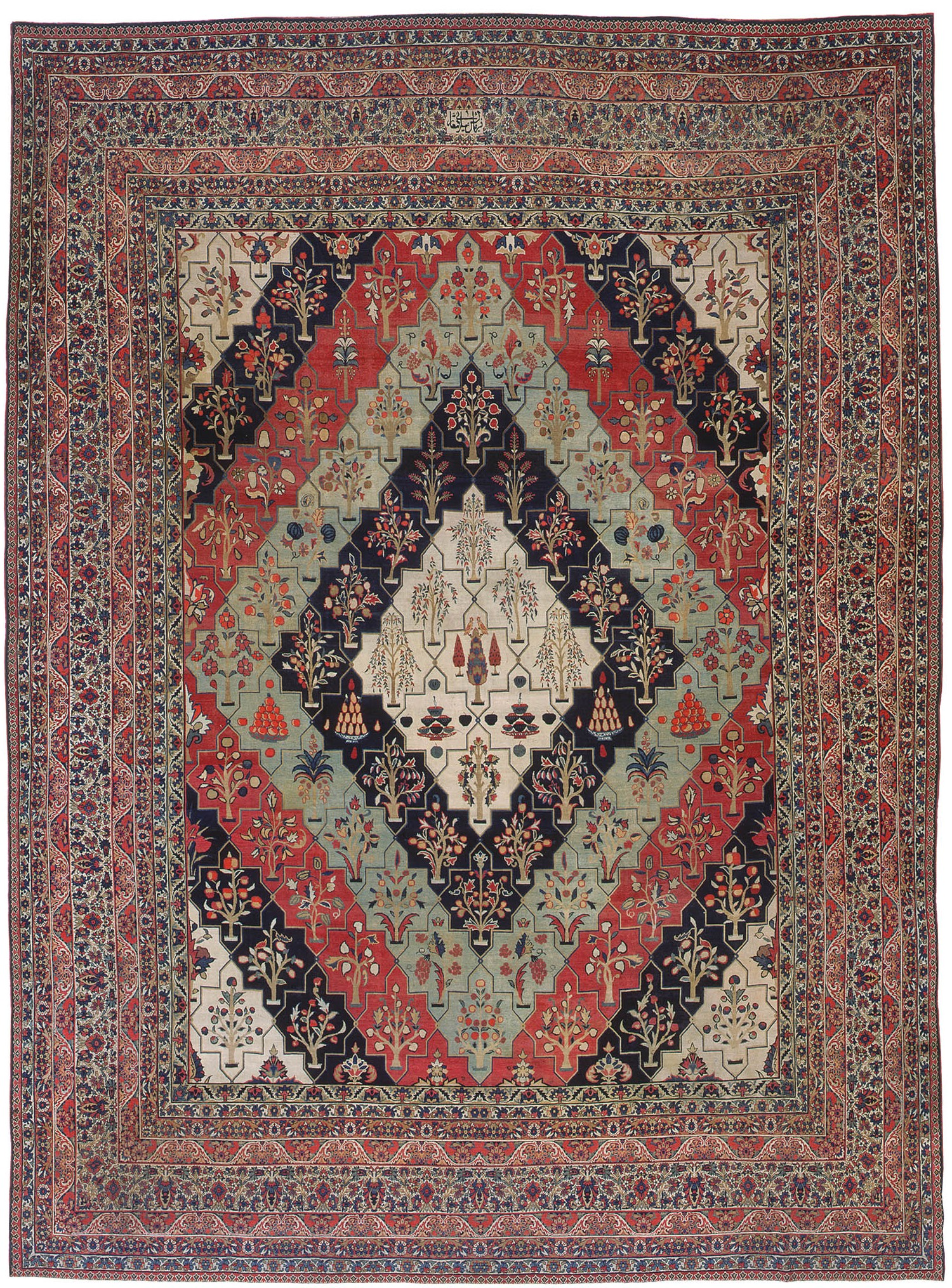
Antique Persian Kerman rug

Kerman carpets (sometimes "Kirman") are one of the traditional classifications of Persian carpets. Kerman is both a city and a province located in south central Iran. The term also sometimes describes a type which may have been made elsewhere. Typical manufacturing techniques use an asymmetrical knot on cotton foundation, but less frequent examples incorporate silk or part silk piles, or silk foundations with wool pile.

== Designs and motifs of the Kerman region ==
Due to the popularity of Kerman rugs both locally and overseas, a wide variety of designs were available.

Damask Rose is the most popular motif in Kerman rug designs, particularly in "Sabzikar Ravar" and "Gol Sorkhi" (Red Rose) rugs. Other well-known motifs are "Ghab Ghora'ani", "Setooni", "Ghabi", "Kheshti", "Saraam Atiyeh", "Jangali", "Shekargah" and "Lachak-Toranj". Antique carpets often use the Toranj motif border of margins and narrow lines. Floral patterns woven into Kerman carpets in the 19th century are derived from the patterns of Kerman shawls, also made in Kerman at the time.

A distinct variation of Kerman carpets is the Lavar or Ravar Kerman. These carpets were produced in the neighbouring city of Ravar, and are known for their fine weave and classically derived design of multiple or central medallion motifs. Most Ravar or Lavar Kerman carpets include a signature, either that of the weaver or the person for whom the carpet was woven.

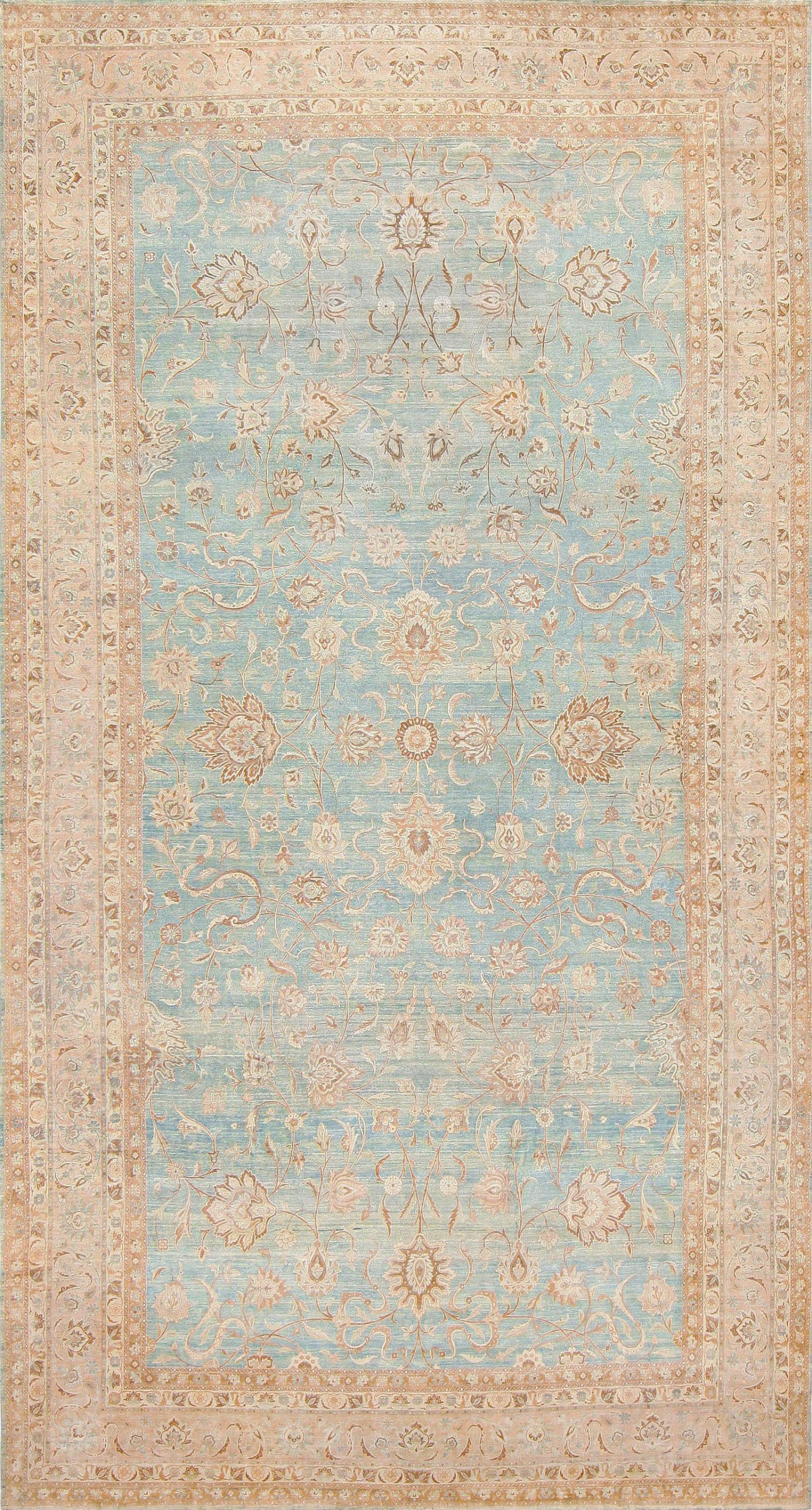
Antique Persian Kerman rug

Vase carpets, a type of Kerman rug distinctive of the 16th and 17th centuries, are characterized by an allover pattern of stylized flowers and oversized palmettes with vases placed throughout the field.

Kerman carpets of the 18th century and later very often use "lattice" patterns, with the central field divided by a lattice design giving many small compartments. A notable example is a carpet having belonged to William Morris, now on display at the Victoria and Albert Museum. Later, many different styles of carpets were made in Kerman, including large figurative ones. The Victoria and Albert Museum in London has a carpet of 1909 with a design copying a painting by the 18th century French artist Antoine Watteau.

Modern Kerman rugs made for western markets are commonly woven in pastel shades of amber, pink, and blue-gray. They may feature western patterns, such as stripes and various repetitive motifs, as well as more traditional vase and garden themes, animal shapes, and pictorial designs.

== Technique ==
May Beattie has defined seven classes of Kerman carpets and identified a structure she called the "vase technique", characterised by three shoots of weft between rows of knots. The first and third are typically woolen and woven at high tension, while the second one, at low tension, is normally made of silk or cotton. Warps are markedly displaced and the Persian knot is open to the left. This technique distinguishes Kerman carpets from both the Safavid (1501-1722) and subsequent (1722-1834) periods. Most Persian carpets, in contrast, used the "Turkish knot".

The dyeing process for Kerman carpets took place while the wool was still in flock before spinning, allowing for uniform color. The colour palette for Kerman carpets is widely varied. Tones can range from ivory, blue and magenta to a golden or saffron cast.

== History ==
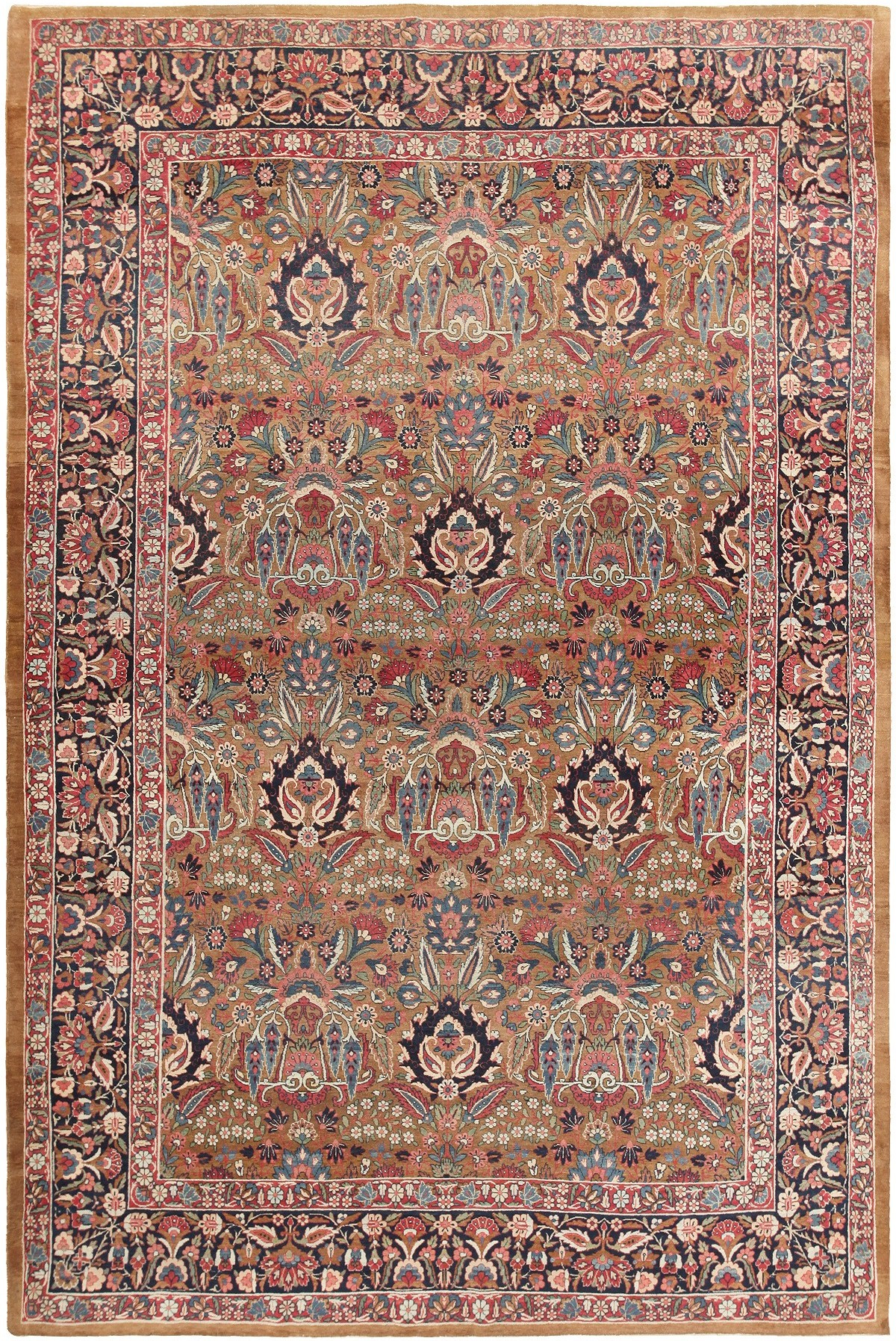
Antique Persian Kerman rug

Kerman has been a major center for the production of high quality carpets since at least the 15th century.

By the 17th century, Kerman's designers were at their most inventive and their weaving techniques were sophisticated for compared to other parts of the Persian empire. For instance, the weavers had learned to set their looms so that the cotton warps were on two different levels. They then threaded the wool wefts, leaving some tight and others loose, giving a wavy finish to the surface of the carpet.

In the 18th century, some authors considered the carpets from the province, especially at Siftan, to be the finest of all Persian carpets. This was in part because of the high quality of the wool from the region, known as Carmania wool. Shahs such as Nader Shah and Naser al-Din Shah commissioned carpets from Kerman in the 18th century.

By the 19th century, the city of Kerman had a long history of urban workshops, quality of wool, and its weavers were revered for their artistry.

== Ravar carpets ==
Ravar carpets (known in Western markets as Lavar Kerman) are among the most delicate and high-quality handwoven carpets of Kerman Province. Carpet production in Ravar began in the late 19th century through the migration of skilled weavers from Kerman and the transfer of design and dyeing techniques.

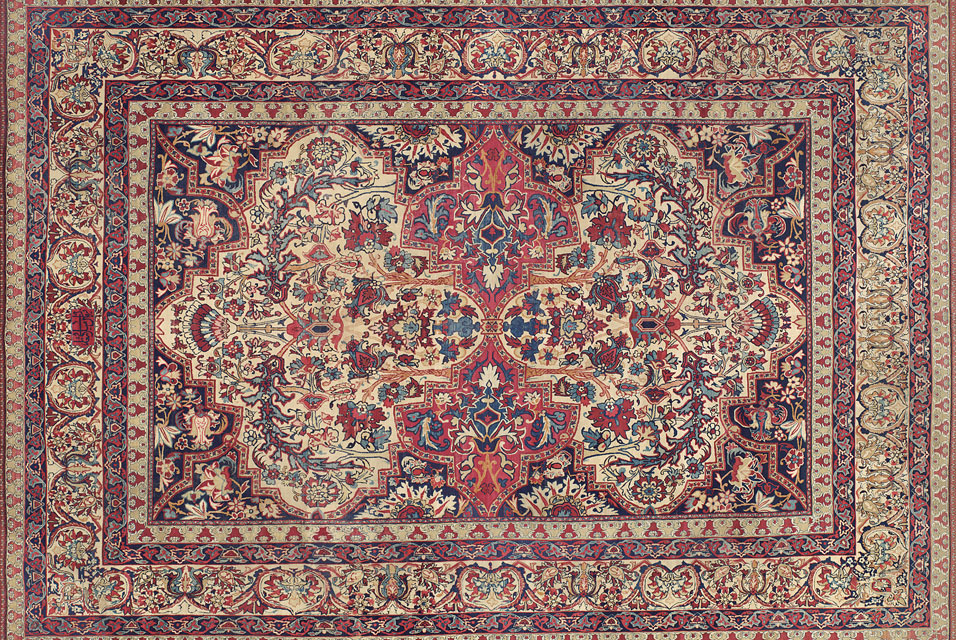
Ravar handwoven carpet - 19th century

It reached its peak in the 1940s–1970s, establishing Ravar as one of Iran’s leading centers of handwoven carpet manufacturing.

Ravar carpets are renowned for their fine weaving, high knot density, use of high-quality local wool, and natural dyes that create a wide spectrum of colors (typically 20–30 shades). Common designs include tree motifs (especially the famous Green Tree or Sabzikar or سبزیکار), vase (گلدانی), floral (افشان), lattice-trench (لچک‌ترنج), hunt scenes (شکارگاه), and the local motif known as Seram (or three partridges). The Seram design is one of the most distinctive local patterns and is still woven with great skill in the region. One of the finest known examples of the tree motif is a green-tree carpet woven in the area approximately 170 years ago.

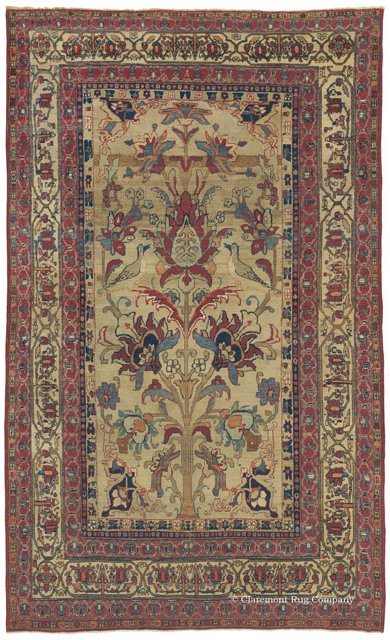
Ravar “Tree of Life” carpet - 18th century

Pictorial (image-based) carpets also became popular in the Qajar and Pahlavi periods in Ravar, and several examples are preserved in collections such as Niavaran Palace.

Ravar Mashahir carpet - 18th century

Internationally, high-quality Kerman and Ravar carpets have repeatedly fetched high prices at auction. Notable among them is the famous Clark Sickle-Leaf Carpet (Sickle-Leaf Vine Scroll and Palmette Carpet), attributed to the Kirman region in the 17th century. It was sold at Sotheby’s New York in 2013 for US$33.8 million, setting a record for the most expensive rug sold at auction. Some Iranian sources link this carpet to the Ravar weaving tradition, although experts classify it as a vase technique from the Safavid period in Kerman.

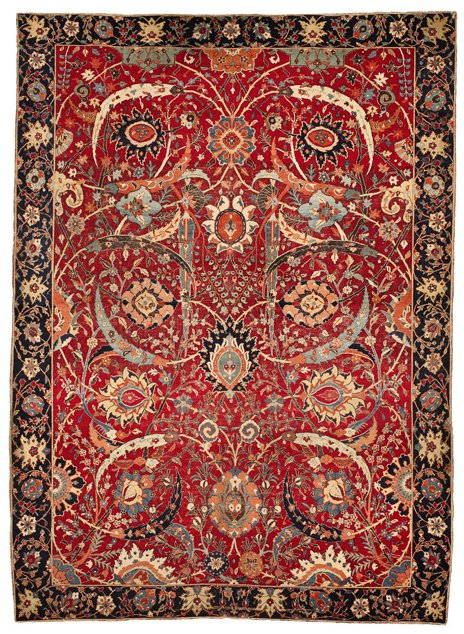
Clark Sickle-Leaf Carpet

Another contemporary example is the carpet for the 2010 FIFA World Cup in South Africa, woven in Ravar and presented to FIFA by the Mes Kerman Football Club.

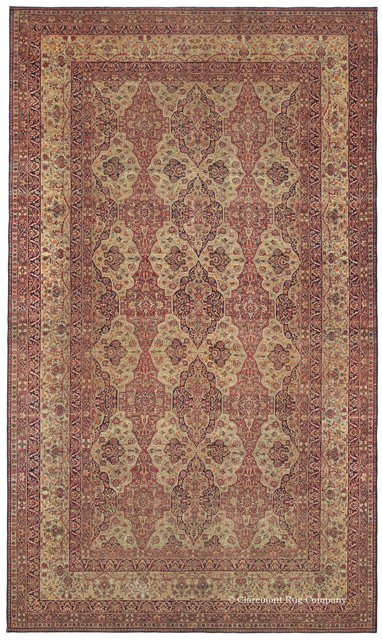
Ravar handwoven carpet - 18th century

Today Ravar is recognized as one of the most important centers of high-quality handwoven carpet production in Kerman Province.
