= Kamal Ali =

British Bangladeshi entrepreneur

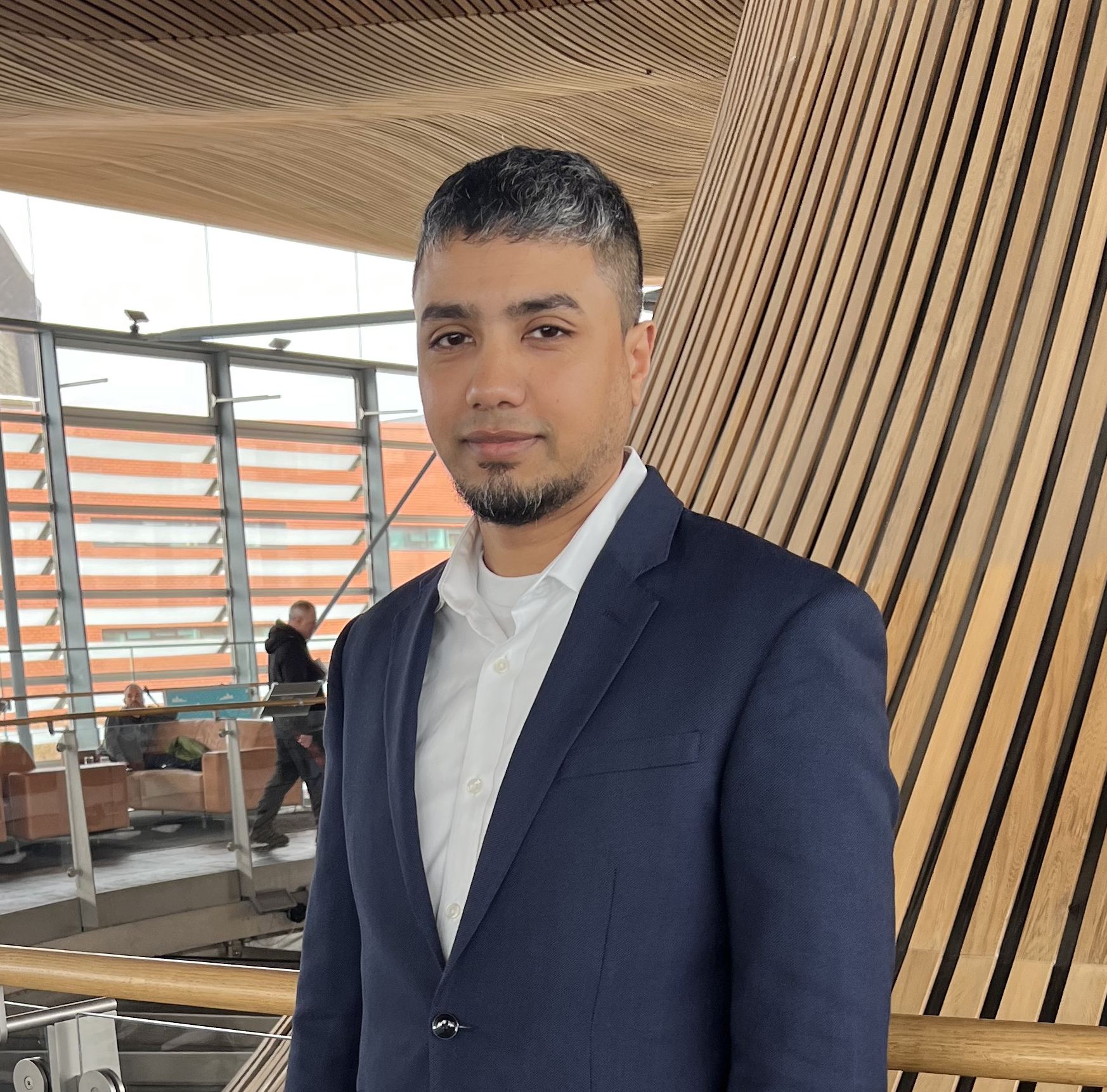
- Born: Newport, Wales
- Education: Design (BA Hons), Product Design (Masters), Teacher of Design Technology (PGCE)
- Alma mater: Bath Spa University, University of South Wales, University of Warwick
- Occupation: Product designer
- Notable work: My Salah Mat

Kamal Ali is a British Bangladeshi entrepreneur and the founder of the educational product, My Salah Mat. He is known for his contribution to the field of Islamic education by inventing the smart interactive Muslim prayer mat.

== Career ==
After completing his studies, Kamal began to develop an anti-theft ihram belt in 2008. This was designed for people traveling for the Islamic Hajj pilgrimage, and led to him launching the brand Hajj Safe, a company that designs and manufactures anti-theft ihram belts. At this time he was a teacher by profession.

After the success of Hajj Safe, Kamal Ali started working on an educational tool that would help young children learn about Salah in an engaging and interactive manner. This led him to conceptualize and create the My Salah Mat which is a prayer mat designed for children that uses interactive technology to teach children to learn to pray in a fun and interactive way. The prayer mat utilizes touch-sensitive sensors and built-in audio to guide children through the various steps of Salah, including positions and recitations.

Ali's product gained widespread recognition and popularity within the Muslim community, both locally and internationally.

In 2014, Ali campaigned to renovate Pill Park for his son's safety. Despite some cleanup by Newport City Council, Ali remained disappointed due to lingering broken glass. He emphasizes the need for CCTV and monitoring. The council acknowledges the concerns and planned to revise park inspections. In 2022, Ali was a finalist for the Welsh Global Entrepreneur Of The Year Award. In 2023, Kamal was selected as a finalist by the Welsh First Minister for the St David Awards in the category of Innovation, Science and Technology.
