= My Salah Mat =

Prayer mat for Muslims

- Type: Private
- Industry: Prayer mat
- Founded: 2018; 8 years ago
- Founder: Kamal Ali
- Headquarters: Newport, South Wales,
- Area served: Worldwide
- Website: mysalahmat.com

My Salah Mat is an interactive prayer mat which was created by Kamal Ali. It is a prayer mat for Muslims which has been described as a 'first ever' by ITV News. In 2022, it went viral in the Middle East.

== History ==
My Salah Mat was founded and created in 2018 by Kamal Ali and the business is headquartered in Newport, South Wales. According to Wales Online, the concept for this interactive prayer mat originated from Kamal Ali's personal experience with his son, who was struggling to learn how to pray.

As per report of the Nation.Cymru, My Salah Mat has contributed a significant portion to the export economy of the Wales. Following which the Wales's Economy Minister, Vaughan Gething visited their headquarter to congratulate them. The Welsh Government also funded their virtual trade trips to Qatar, the UAE and Malaysia in order to helped them determine the best routes of entry into these territories.

In 2022, it was featured in the Nuremberg International Toy Fair through My Salah Mat Deutschland.
