= Podruchnik =

Russian Old Believer prayer mat

The Podruchnik (Russian: "подручник", literally "something under an arm") is a small prayer rug, once used in prayer by all Russian Orthodox Christians in the Tsardom of Russia before the schism of 1653 but currently in use only by the Old Believers.

== Description and use ==
Measuring roughly 40 cm by 40 cm, the Podruchnik takes the form of a small cushion, often with patchwork decoration which varies from region to region. Its sole function is to keep the worshipper's hands and face clean during the frequent prostrations that occur in church services, as it is felt that the fingers used to make the Sign of the Cross must remain clean during prayers.

During church services, when prostrations are made, as the worshipper lowers his torso, he flips the Podruchnik onto the ground in such a way that when he is kneeling and prostrate on the ground, the Podruchnik protects his hands and forehead from the dirt and grime of the floor.

When not in use, they are stored at the side of the church, stacked up in such a manner that the dirty sides touch each other and the clean sides only touch other clean sides.

Some Spiritual Christians (Dukh-i-zhizniki, Pryguny and Molokane) bring their own handkerchief for similar prostration rituals, usually performed on clean floors while holding the kerchief. When a floor may be dirty, prostrations can be done as low kneeling without touching the floor with hands or head.

== See also ==
- Prayer rug
- Russian Orthodox Oldritualist Church
- Old Believers
- Zemnoy poklon
