= Ravar =

City in Kerman province, Iran

Ravar Persian: راور
- City
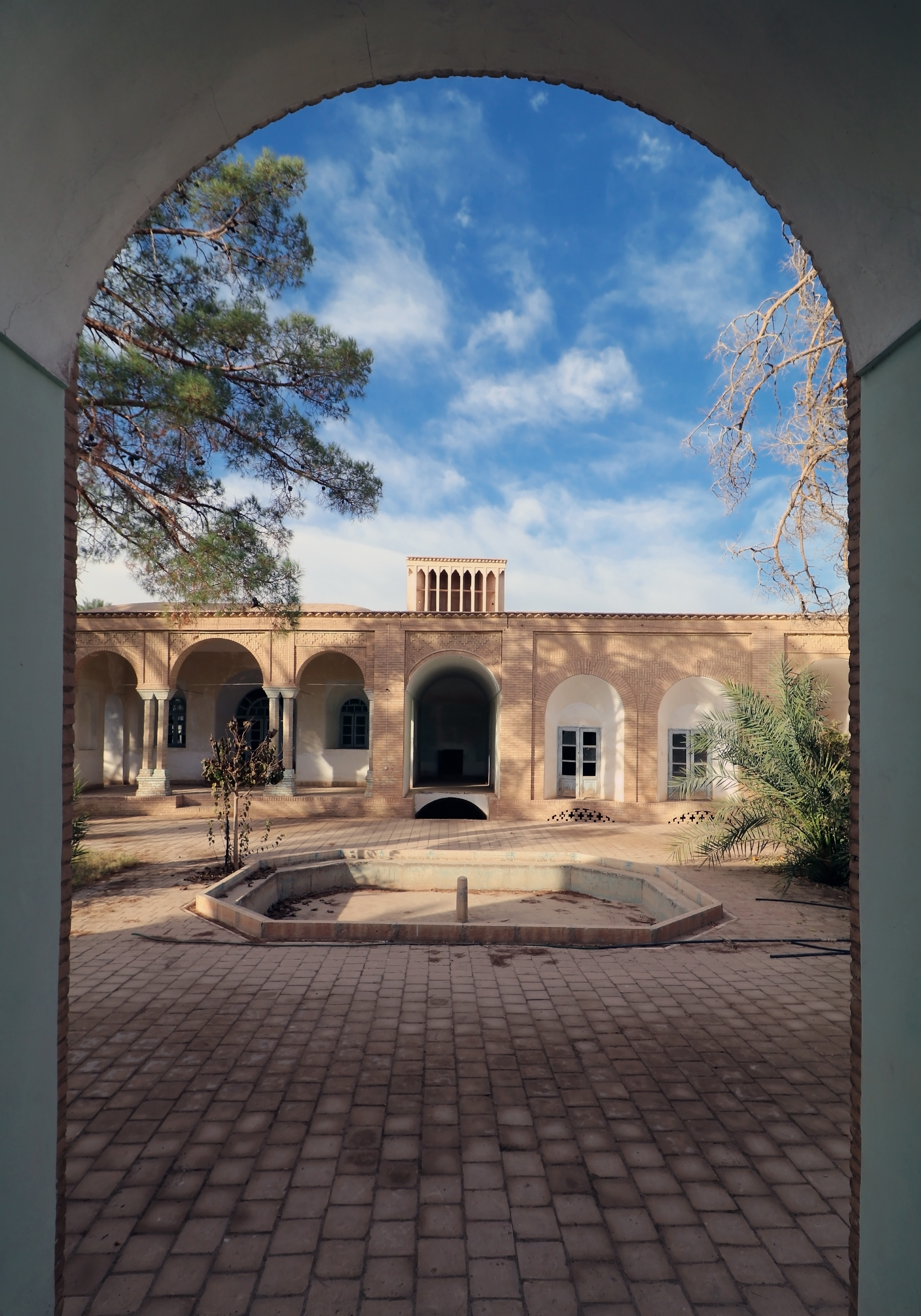
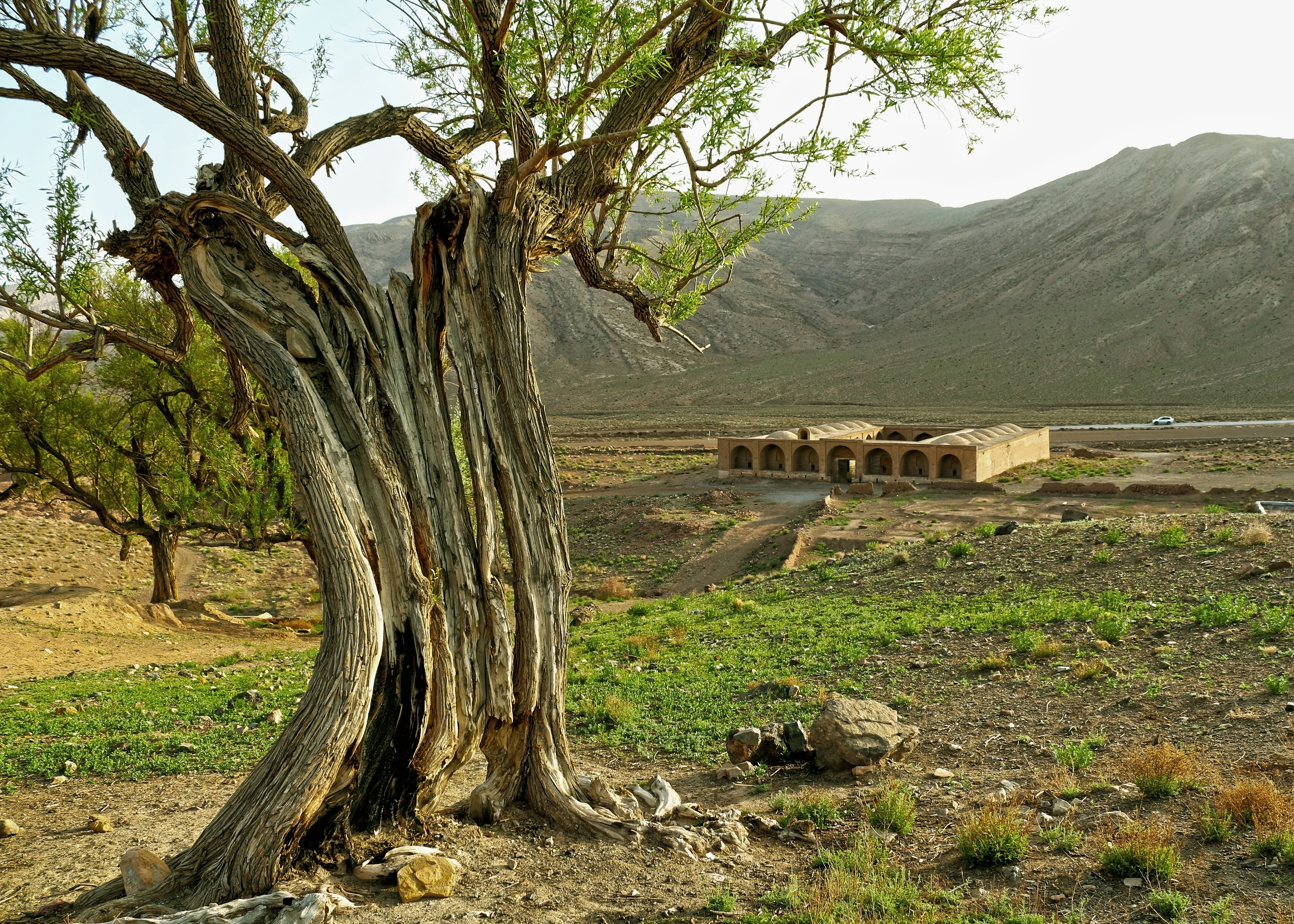
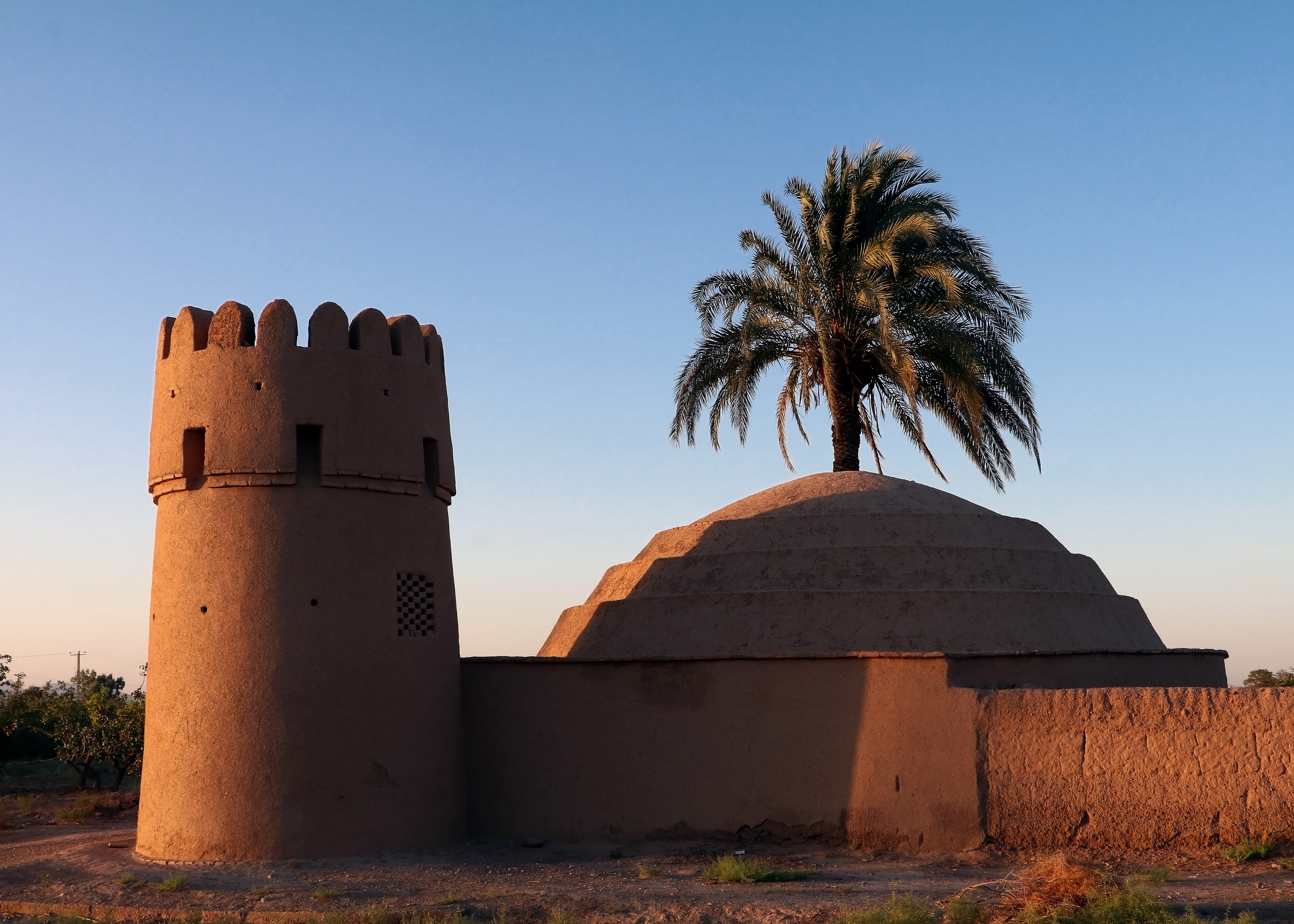

- Location within Iran
- Coordinates: 31°15′48″N 56°48′26″E
- Country: Iran
- Province: Kerman
- County: Ravar
- District: Central
- Elevation: 1,755 m (5,758 ft)

Population (2016)
  - Total: 22,729
- Time zone: UTC+3:30 (IRST)

Ravar (Persian: راور) (Note: Also romanized as Rāvar) is a city in the Central District of Ravar County, Kerman province, Iran, serving as capital of both the county and the district. Known as the national carpet city of Iran, Ravar produces a distinctive type of Kerman carpet, and is also well known for its vast pistachio fields. Ravar has two UNESCO World Heritage Sites: the Chah Kouran Caravanserai and the Chehel Payeh Caravanserai.

== History ==
Ravar (formerly known as Rahvar and Khavar) is a city in the north of Kerman Province and the capital of Ravar County. It is located on the western edge of the Dasht-e Lut (Lut Desert) along the historic route from Kerman to Khorasan. The name "Ravar" is considered a shortened form of "Rahvar," meaning "guardian" or "protector of the road," as the area has long served as a station for road maintenance and protection of caravans against bandits.

=== Pre-Islamic and Sasanian periods ===
According to local traditions and some sources, approximately 16 centuries ago the region was inhabited by Zoroastrians and was known as "Khavar-zamin" (the eastern land). The presence of a Zoroastrian dakhma (tower of silence) and a fire temple near the city (in the villages of Sharifabad and Dehuj) supports this historical background.

The oldest known monument in the area is Qahqa Castle (Qaleh-ye Qahqa), located about 3 km east of the city near the village of Deh-e Shib. This mud-brick castle dates to the Sasanian Empire (224–651 CE), with some researchers estimating its age at 3,000 to 4,500 years. It was registered as an Iranian national heritage site on 21 March 1966 under registration number 498. Today it survives mainly as a mound of earth and brick remains, damaged by earthquakes and erosion. During this period, Ravar held strategic importance as a defensive and logistical outpost on the edge of the Lut Desert.

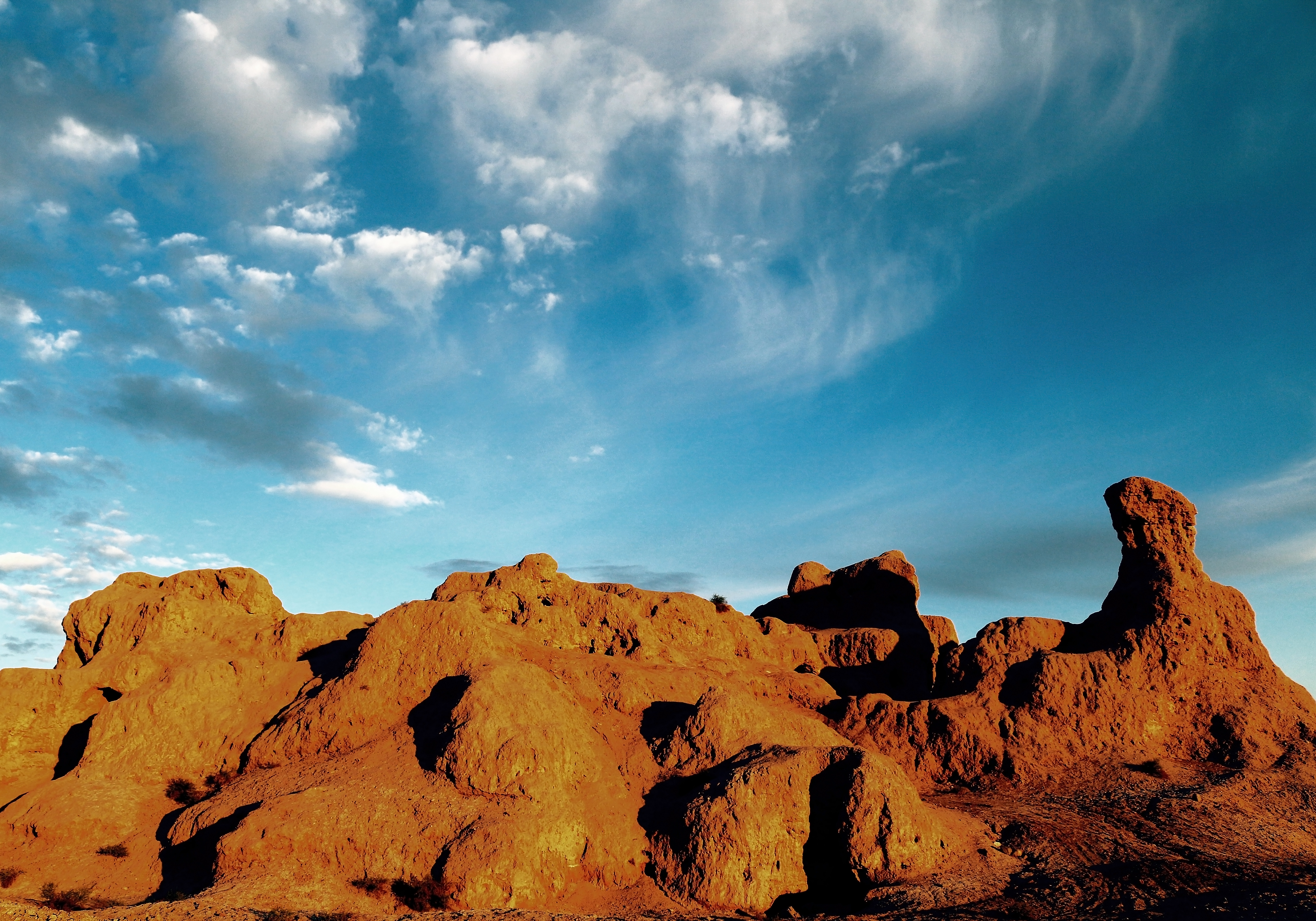
Qahqa Castle – Sasanian period

=== Islamic period (from the Arab conquest to the Safavid era) ===
After the Muslim conquest of Iran in the 7th century CE, the Kerman region (including Ravar) came under successive Islamic dynasties. Ravar’s strategic position on the caravan and pilgrimage route from Kerman to Khorasan and Mashhad ensured its continued importance as a road station. During the Kerman Seljuk period (5th–6th centuries AH) and later under the Qara Khitai, Muzaffarids, and Timurids, the route remained active, although direct references to Ravar in early geographical sources are limited.

In the Safavid period (1501–1736), Ravar functioned as a peripheral center within the province of Kerman. Caravanserais along the pilgrimage route to Mashhad were strengthened, and the foundations of local textile production (which later developed into carpet weaving) were laid. Safavid governors of Kerman occasionally paid attention to the area, including Ravar, to counter eastern unrest (such as Baloch raids).

The presence of fire temples and dakhma (Tower of Silence) in this region, particularly in the villages of Dehoj and Sharifabad—whose construction dates back to the post-Islamic period and the Safavid era—indicates the residence of a significant Zoroastrian population in the city of Ravar during the post-Islamic period.

=== Qajar period ===
During the Qajar dynasty (1789–1925), Ravar prospered due to its location on the main Kerman–Mashhad route. Numerous caravanserais were built or restored in this period, including the Ab Bid Caravanserai, Chah Kouran Caravanserai (UNESCO World Heritage), Darband Caravanserai, Chehel Payeh Caravanserai (UNESCO World Heritage), Sohraj Caravanserai, and Horuz Caravanserai, to serve pilgrims and merchants. The historic Ravar Bazaar, the Ravar Ice House (Yakhchal), defensive towers (such as Feyzabad Tower), and cisterns (such as the Ghiyath Cistern) also largely date from this era.

From the late 19th century, with the migration of weavers from Kerman (due to unrest and wars), the carpet-weaving industry flourished in Ravar. Ravar carpets (known in the West as Lavar Kerman) gained international recognition. Prior to this, canvas (karbas) and shawl weaving had been common.

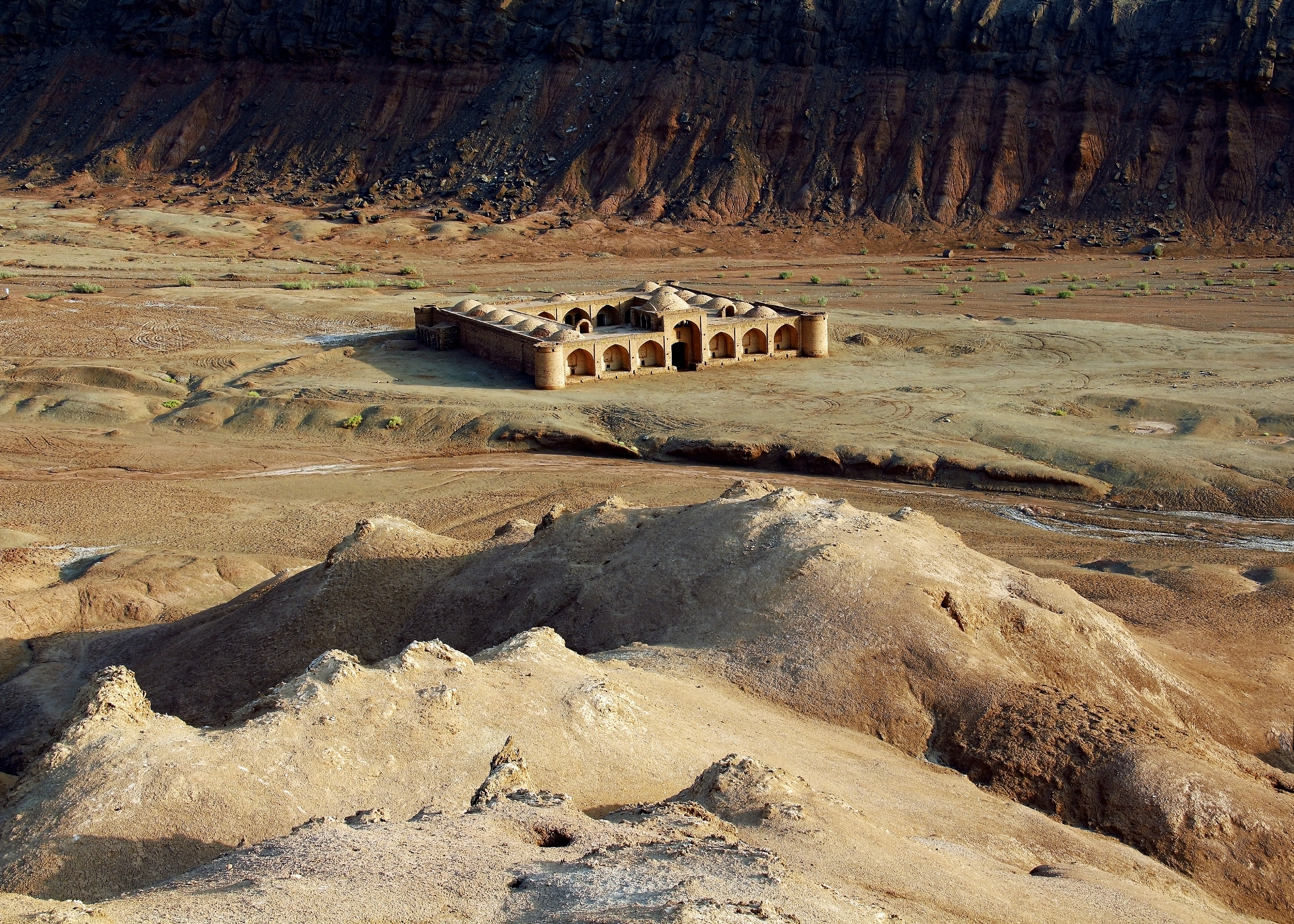
Chah Kouran Caravanserai – UNESCO World Heritage Site

=== Pahlavi period and contemporary era ===
Ravar was elevated to city status in 1936 (1315 SH) and became a district (bakhsh) in 1937 (1316 SH). Carpet weaving reached its peak between the 1940s and 1970s, establishing Ravar as one of Iran’s major centers of handwoven carpet production. Until 1995–1996 it formed part of Kerman County; thereafter, with the addition of the rural districts of Ravar, Horjand, and Horuz, it became an independent county.

Today Ravar is known as the “National City of Handwoven Carpets.” Its historic monuments (the castle, caravanserais, towers, and ice house) reflect the city’s enduring strategic and economic importance on the edge of the desert over the centuries.

== Demographics ==
=== Population ===
At the time of the 2006 National Census, the city's population was 18.500 in 5,921 households. The following census in 2011 counted 19.100 people in 6,260 households. The 2016 census measured the population of the city as 19,800 people in 6,874 households.

== Ravar carpets ==
Ravar carpets (known in Western markets as Lavar Kerman) are among the most delicate and high-quality handwoven carpets of Kerman Province. Carpet production in Ravar began in the late 19th century through the migration of skilled weavers from Kerman and the transfer of design and dyeing techniques.

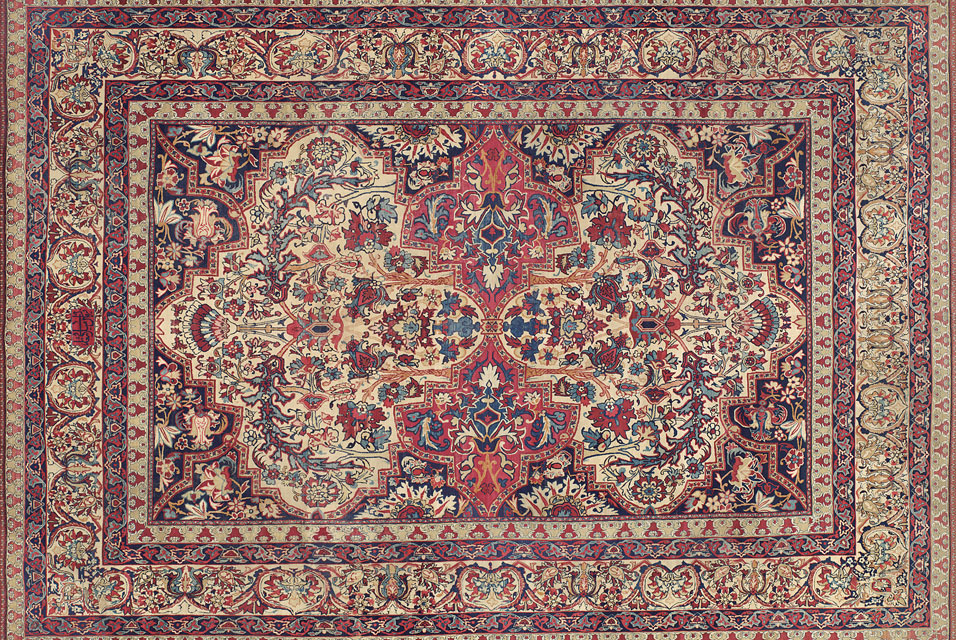
Ravar handwoven carpet - 19th century

It reached its peak in the 1940s–1970s, establishing Ravar as one of Iran’s leading centers of handwoven carpet manufacturing.

Ravar carpets are renowned for their fine weaving, high knot density, use of high-quality local wool, and natural dyes that create a wide spectrum of colors (typically 20–30 shades). Common designs include tree motifs (especially the famous Green Tree or Sabzikar or سبزیکار), vase (گلدانی), floral (افشان), lattice-trench (لچک‌ترنج), hunt scenes (شکارگاه), and the local motif known as Seram (or three partridges). The Seram design is one of the most distinctive local patterns and is still woven with great skill in the region. One of the finest known examples of the tree motif is a green-tree carpet woven in the area approximately 170 years ago.

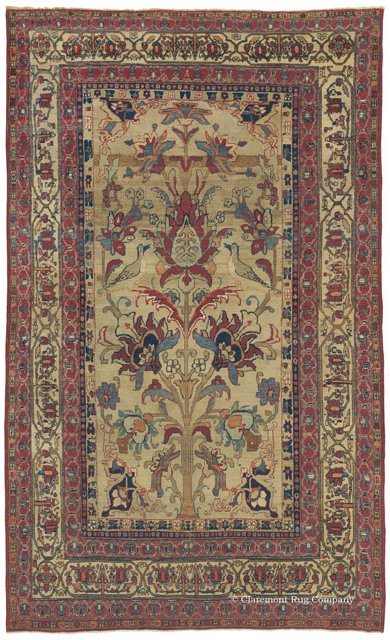
Ravar “Tree of Life” carpet - 18th century

Pictorial (image-based) carpets also became popular in the Qajar and Pahlavi periods in Ravar, and several examples are preserved in collections such as Niavaran Palace.

Ravar Mashahir carpet - 18th century

Internationally, high-quality Kerman and Ravar carpets have repeatedly fetched high prices at auction. Notable among them is the famous Clark Sickle-Leaf Carpet (Sickle-Leaf Vine Scroll and Palmette Carpet), attributed to the Kirman region in the 17th century. It was sold at Sotheby’s New York in 2013 for US$33.8 million, setting a record for the most expensive rug sold at auction. Some Iranian sources link this carpet to the Ravar weaving tradition, although experts classify it as a vase technique from the Safavid period in Kerman.

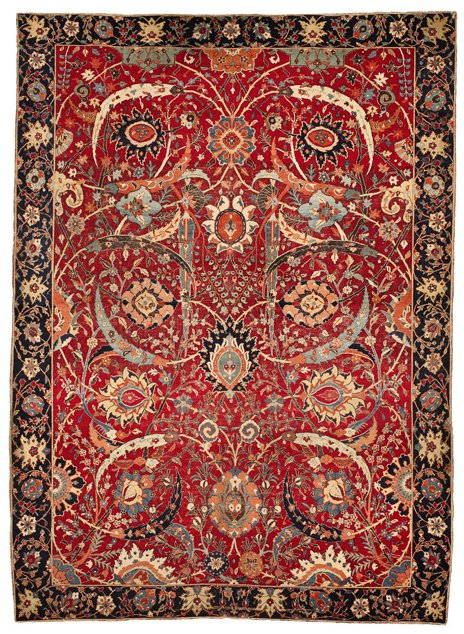
Clark Sickle-Leaf Carpet

Another contemporary example is the carpet for the 2010 FIFA World Cup in South Africa, woven in Ravar and presented to FIFA by the Mes Kerman Football Club.

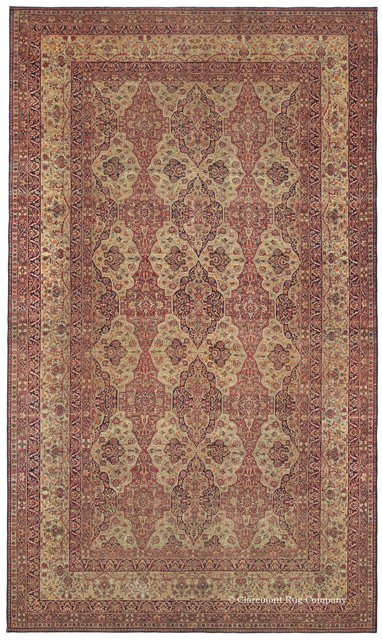
Ravar handwoven carpet - 18th century

Today Ravar is recognized as one of the most important centers of high-quality handwoven carpet production in Kerman Province.

== Gallery ==
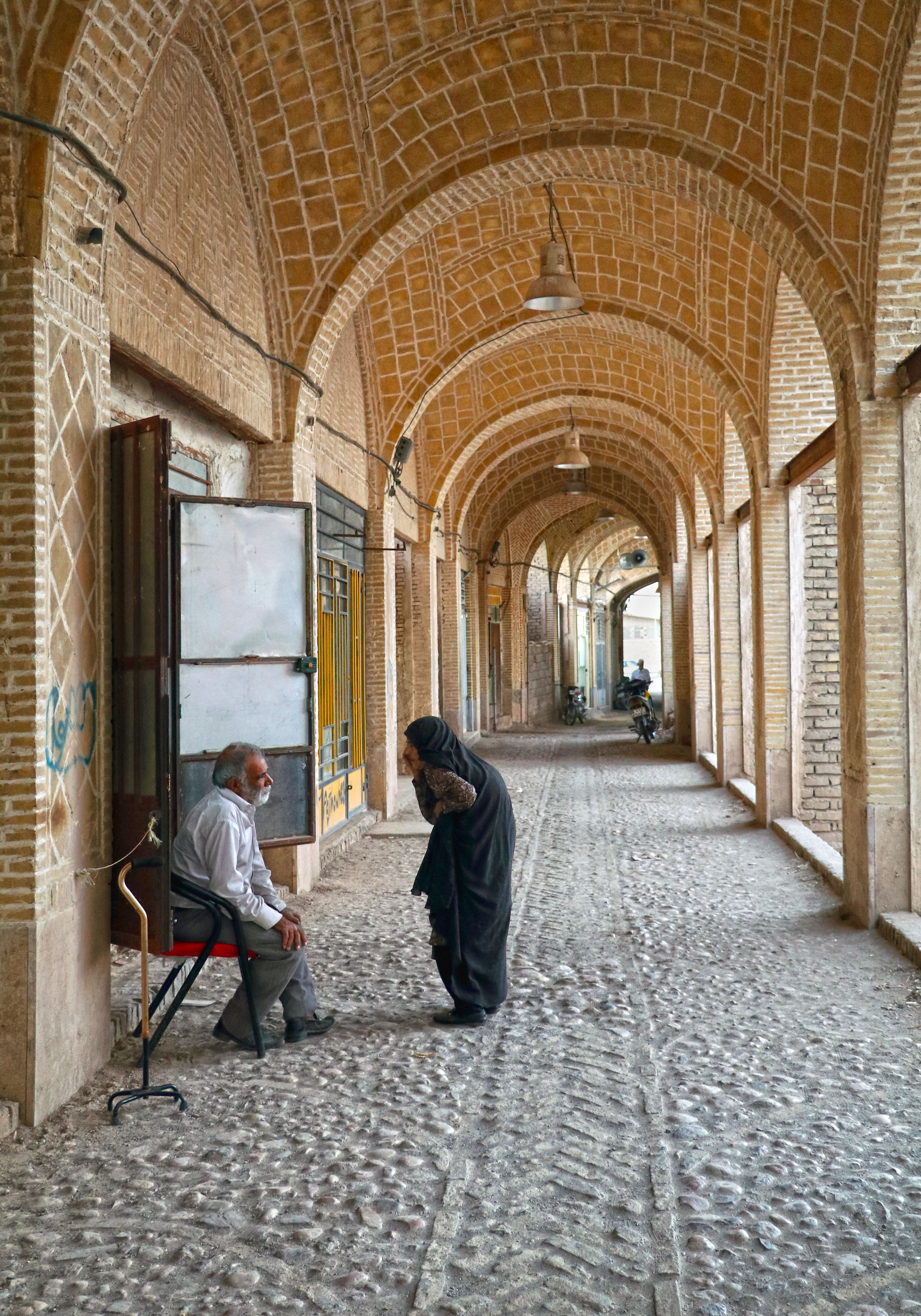
Old bazaar of Ravar

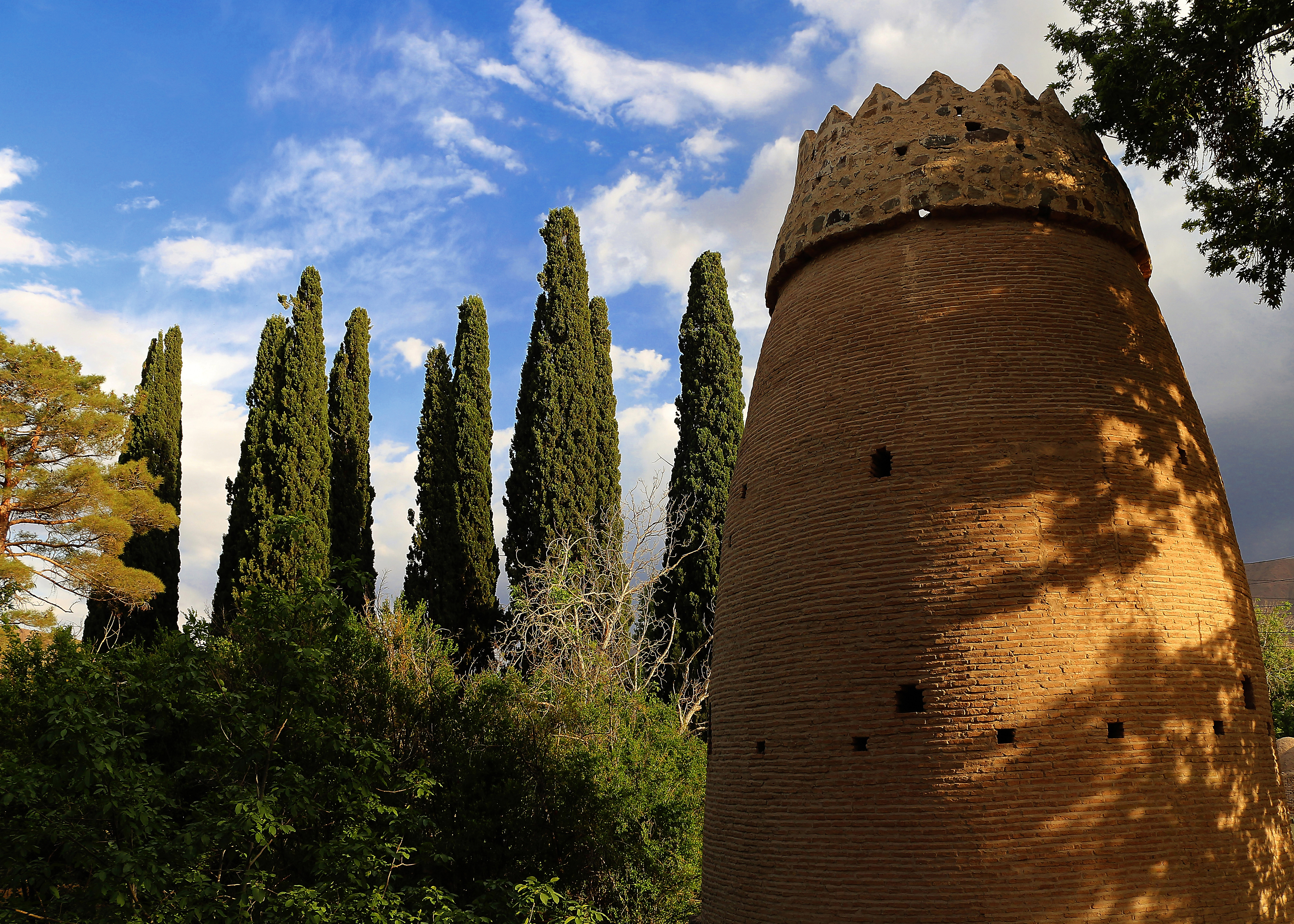
Circular tower and ancient cypress trees in Taraz village, Ravar

Haj Yousef water reservoir

Ghiyas Complex

Stairs of the Ghiyas water reservoir
