= Rasht embroidery =

Iranian regional embroidery style

19th century prayer rug featuring Rasht embroidery

Rasht embroidery (Persian: رشتی‌دوزی, romanized: Rashti-duzi) is a Persian art and handicraft. It is a decorative felt panel with a fine detail chain stitch embroidery, originating in the city of Rasht in Gilan province, Iran. This style of craft flourished in the 16th and 17th centuries in what is now Northwest Iran. Rasht embroidery is listed as part of Iran's Intangible Cultural Heritage by UNESCO.

== History ==
The exact history of Rasht embroidery is unknown, however the earliest pieces of tapestry found have been from the Achaemenid Empire period. Rasht was a major silk trade center with numerous textile workshops, and an international trade port. Rasht embroidery was provided for the Safavid dynasty royal courts at Ardabil and Tabriz. This craft was traditionally created by men in workshops, however in modern times it is now made primarily by women. Rasht embroidery is applied to decorate items include curtains, carpets, saddle cover, rugs, hats, clothes, tablecloths, bedspreads, and shrouds for tombs.

Rasht embroidery is created using felted flannel wool, the designs were applied to the felt with powdered chalk that is pressed into the fabric, and the chain is stitched with colored silks using a metal crochet hook. The outer portion of the image is often framed with a different color.

Examples of this embroidery can be found in museums including the Metropolitan Museum of Art, the Hermitage Museum, and the Victoria and Albert Museum.

== See also ==
- Iranian handicrafts
- Persian embroidery
