= Persian embroidery =

Embroidery of Persia

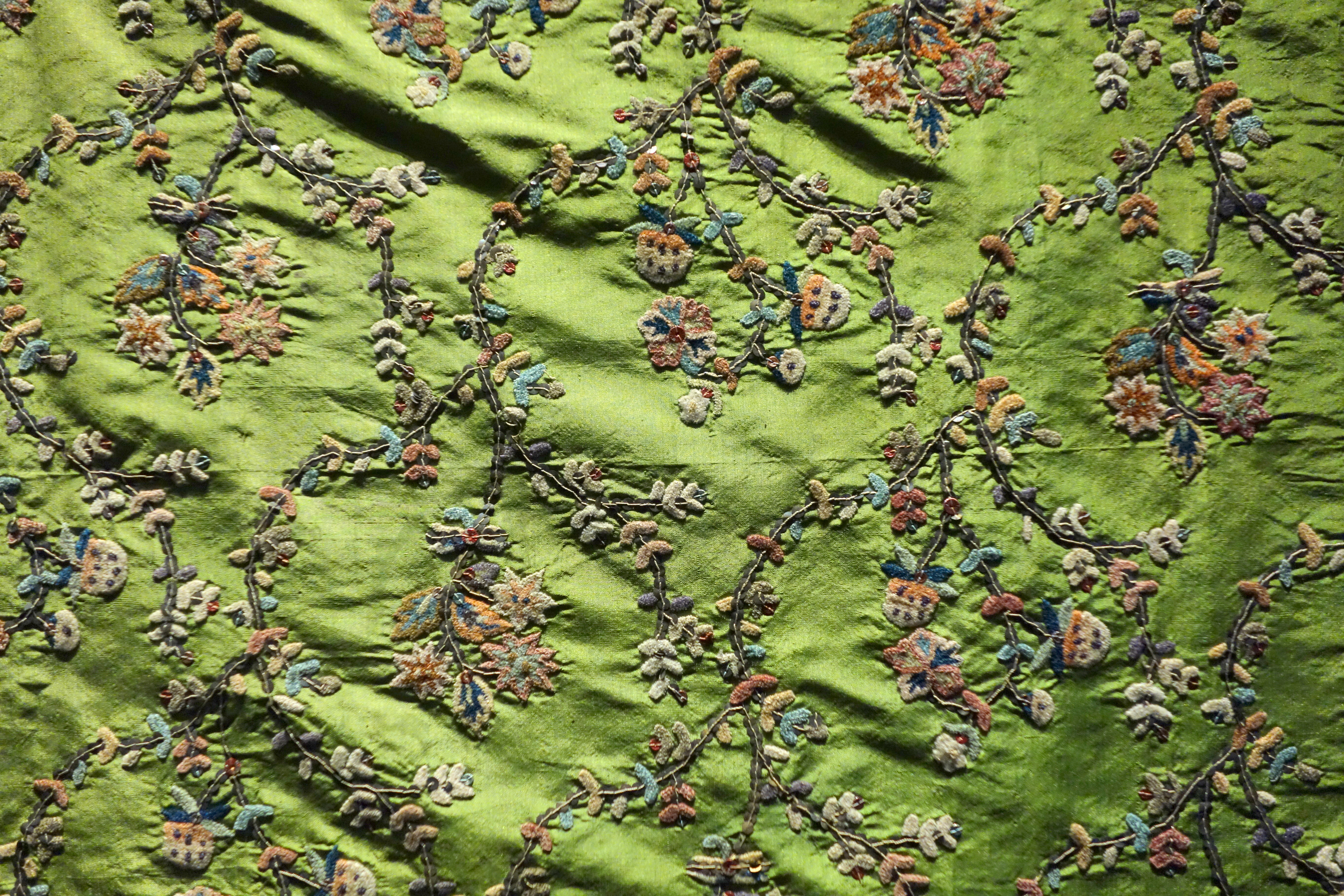
An example of sequined embroidery from the 1800s

Persian embroidery is a type of Persian art and handicraft.

== History ==
It has been speculated that Persian embroidery existed from ancient times and at least from the time of the Sasanian Empire, based on numerous designs visible on rock sculptures and silverware of that period, and have been classified by Professor Ernst Herzfeld. Patterns on the coat of Chosroes II at Taq-e Bostan are in high relief; they may represent embroidery. Roundels, animals, and other familiar motifs of Sasanian art were also used as patterns for sculptures representing embroidery.

The earliest piece of physical Persian embroidery is from the Seljuk Empire (1037–1194 A.D.); it featured a strong Chinese-style pattern influencing the design. The Chinese style of embroidery of this time featured a satin stitch (Persian: ṭirāz) made of silk thread and was applied mainly for ornamentation purposes.

== Peculiarities ==
The chain stitch (Persian: gulab-duzi) was used in many types of Persian embroidery, most notably in the regional Rasht embroidery. The embroidery featuring metal tinsel in tulle (Persian: naghdeh-duzi) is a common technique of the Jews of Iran.

Sermeh embroidery (Persian: sermeh-duzi) is an Iranian ancient-style of embroidery with origins that date back to the Achaemenid dynasty (705–330 B.C.E.), and features gold and/or silver embroidery. The gold and silver embroidery (Persian: malileh-duzi) style flourished across Persia and was used for decorating household objects.

Pateh is an Iranian traditional needlework folk art originated in and is largely associated with Kerman province, and traditionally created by women. Pateh needlework is created using silk thread, common designs include the cypress tree and the sun with flourishes of paisley patterns.

== See also ==
- Arts of Iran
- Shahin Ebrahimzadeh-Pezeshki, textile artist, and historian of Persian traditional clothing and Iranian tribal clothing
- Sichuan embroidery
