= Iranian handicrafts =

Iranian handicrafts are handicraft or handmade crafted works originating from Iran.

== Basketry and wickerwork ==
- Boryabaf, a bamboo wickerwork or textile, used to make floor mats, stools, and fans.
- Kapu (basket), a palm leaf basketry.
- Tutan (boat), an indigenous boat made of tobacco leaves found in the Hamun Lake region

== Carpets and rugs ==
- Persian carpet
  - Abadeh rug, type of carpet with a large diamond pattern
  - Afshar rugs, carpets from the Turkic Afshar tribe
  - Ardabil Carpet, the name of two different famous Safavid carpets which became a style
  - Dilmaghani, the oldest existing manufacturers of hand knotted carpets
  - Gabbeh, a type of Persian nomadic carpet
  - Heriz rug, type of carpet with copper in the wool and bold patterns with a large medallion
  - Shiraz rug, a type of Persian carpet
  - Tabriz rug, genre of carpets found in Tabriz
- Kilims, flat woven rug or tapestry
  - Zili, type of Kilim
- Soumak, flat woven rug, bedding, or tapestry; a stronger and thicker weave than a Kilim
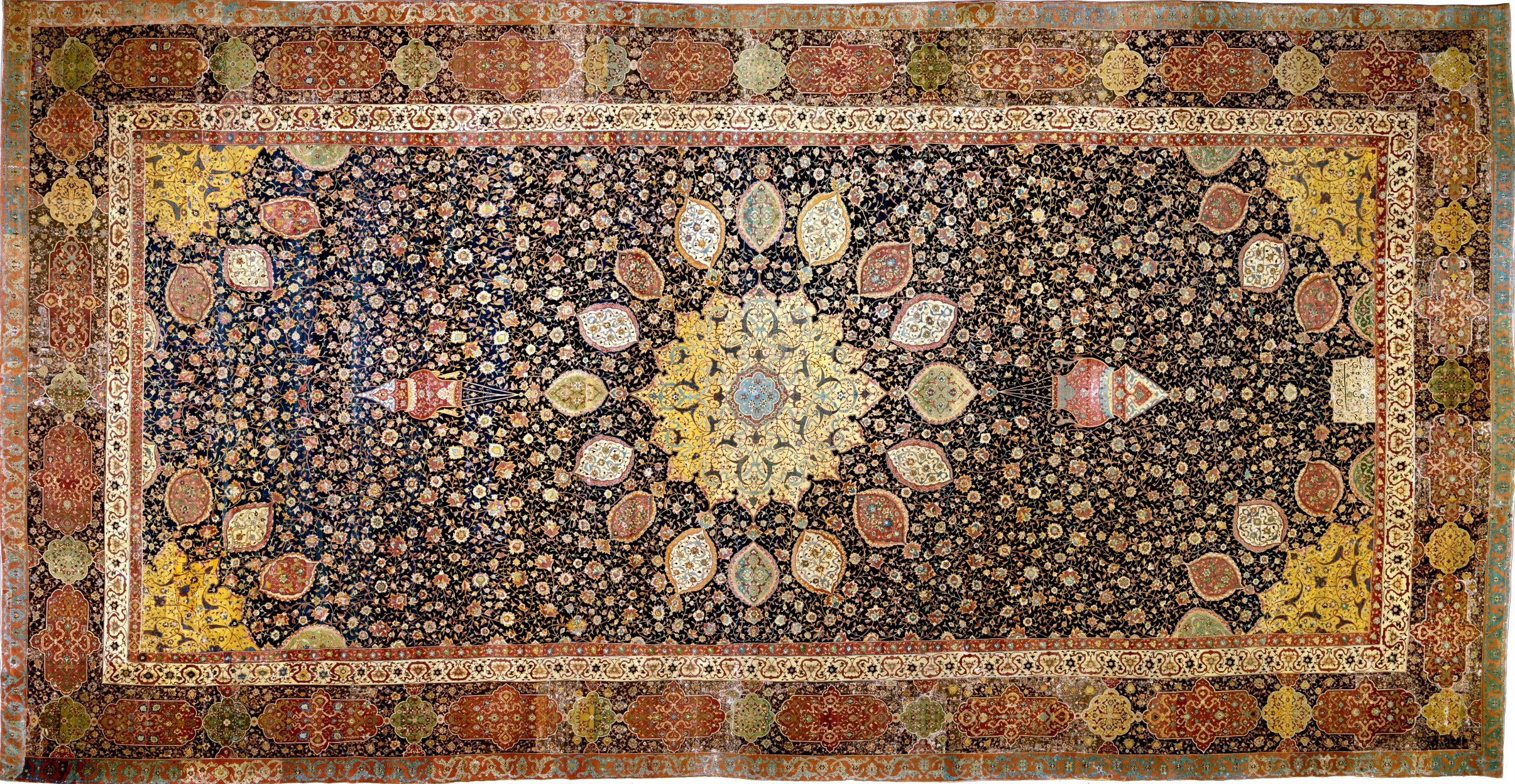
The Ardabil carpet

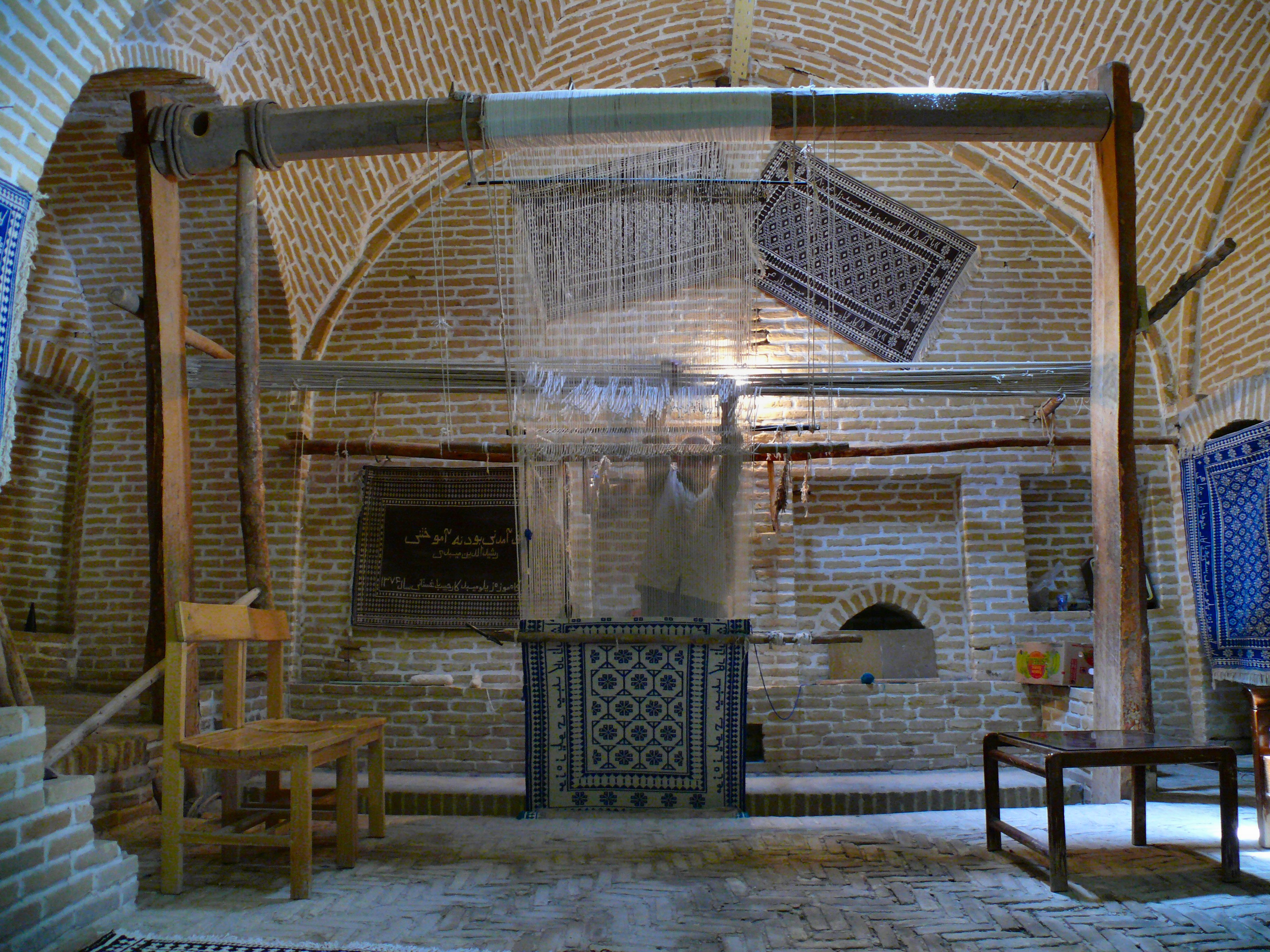
weaving a carpet in a caravansari in Meybod

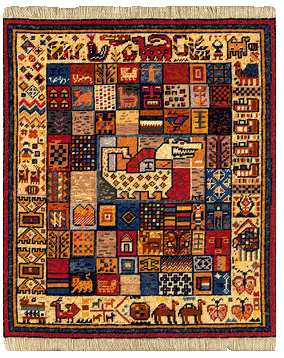
gabbeh carpet

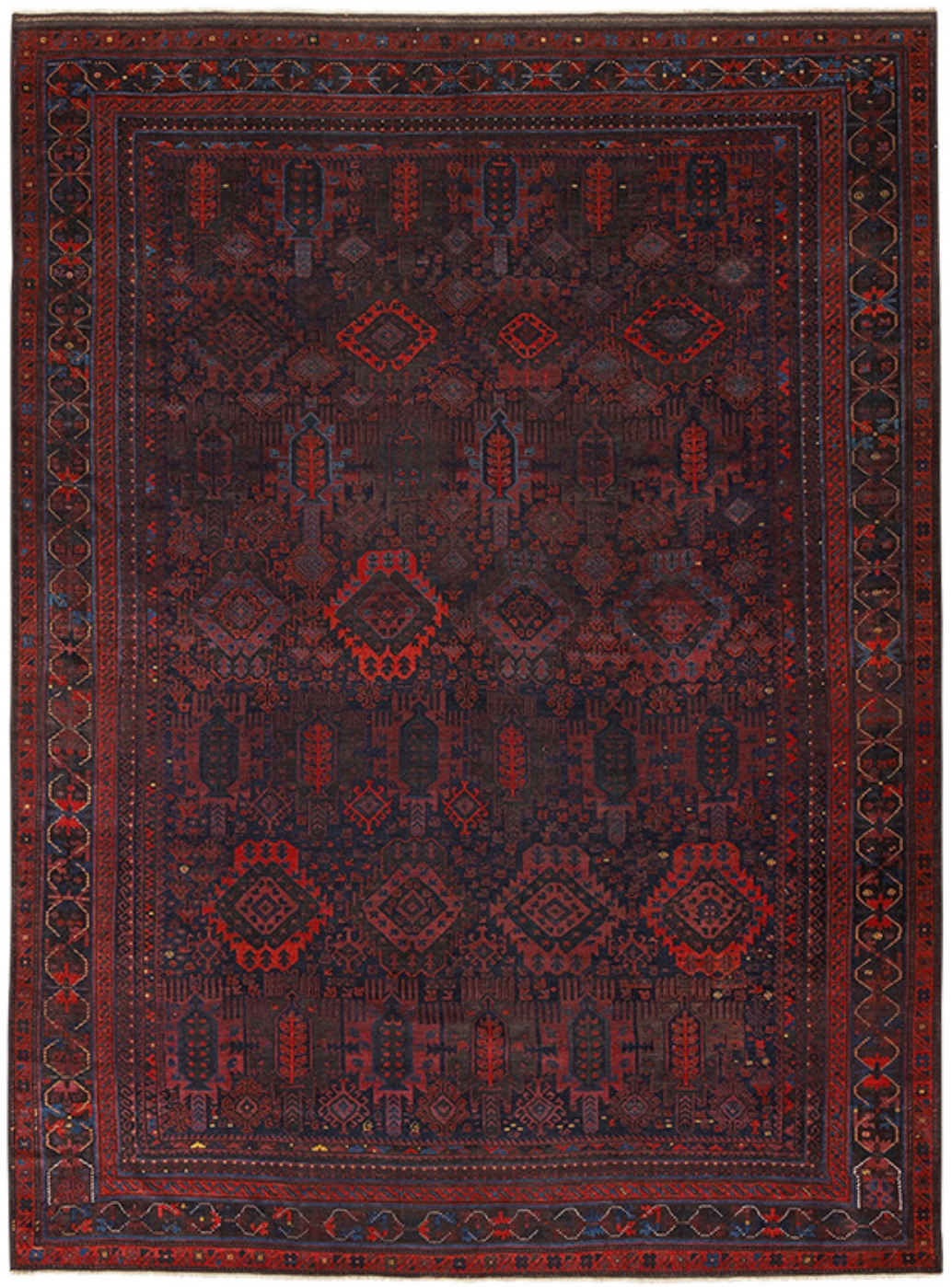
Baluch carpet, mid–19th century

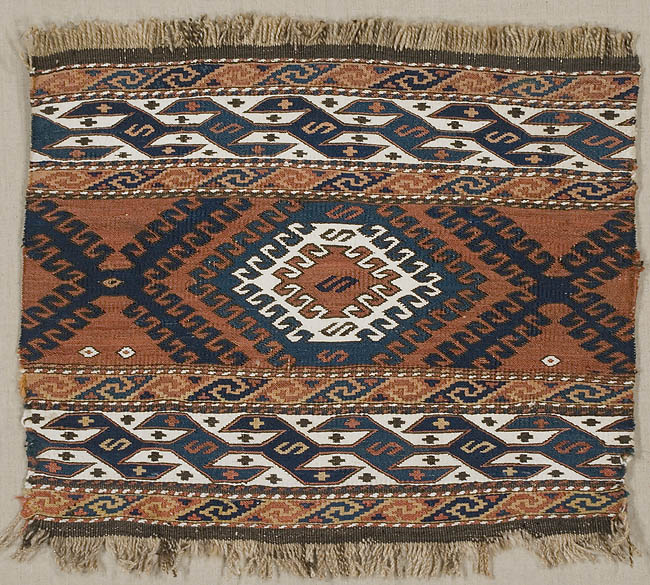
Soumak rug

== Textiles ==
- Persian embroidery
  - Pateh, needlework on wool, with colored thread, mostly of silk. It is mostly created by women.
  - Rasht embroidery
  - Sermeh embroidery
  - Sistan embroidery and Sistan cream embroidery, using a black, cream or white thread color to decorate clothing or other fabrics
  - Zardozi, metal embroidery thread work made of silver or gold.
- Balochi needlework
- Brocade, shuttle-woven fabrics often made in colored silks and sometimes with gold and silver threads.
- Felt, a traditional weaving, common to the Kermanshah province
- Ghelimche, a traditional machine woven fabric
- Ghalamkar, wood-block printed fabric, often used for table cloths or as bedspreads.
- Khameh, silk embroidered on raw-colored fabric, typically in all white.
- Jajim, hand-woven, colorful fabric often found in rural areas
- Termeh, hand woven fabric, often used for table cloths, or made into shawls.
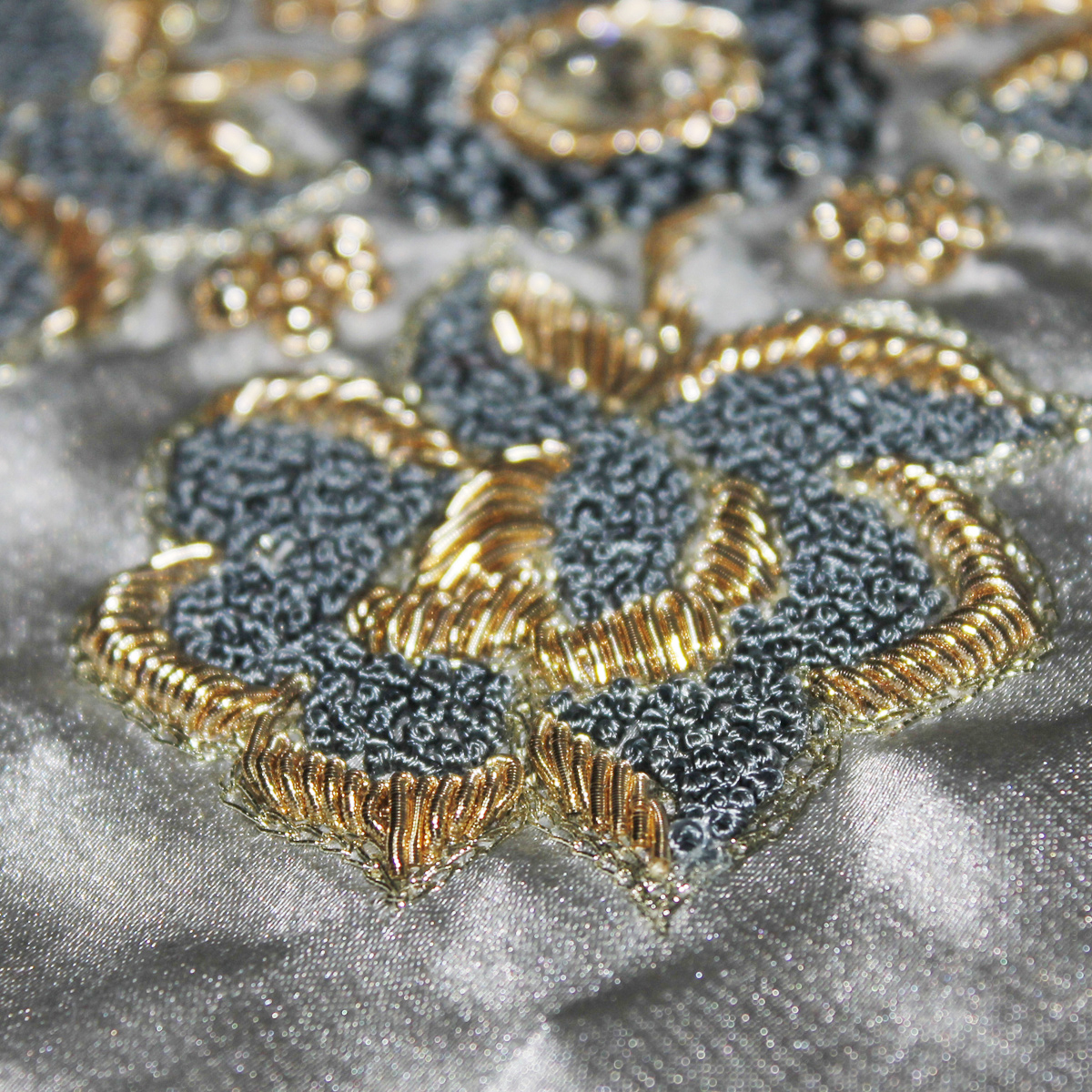
Up-close of Zardozi metal embroidery

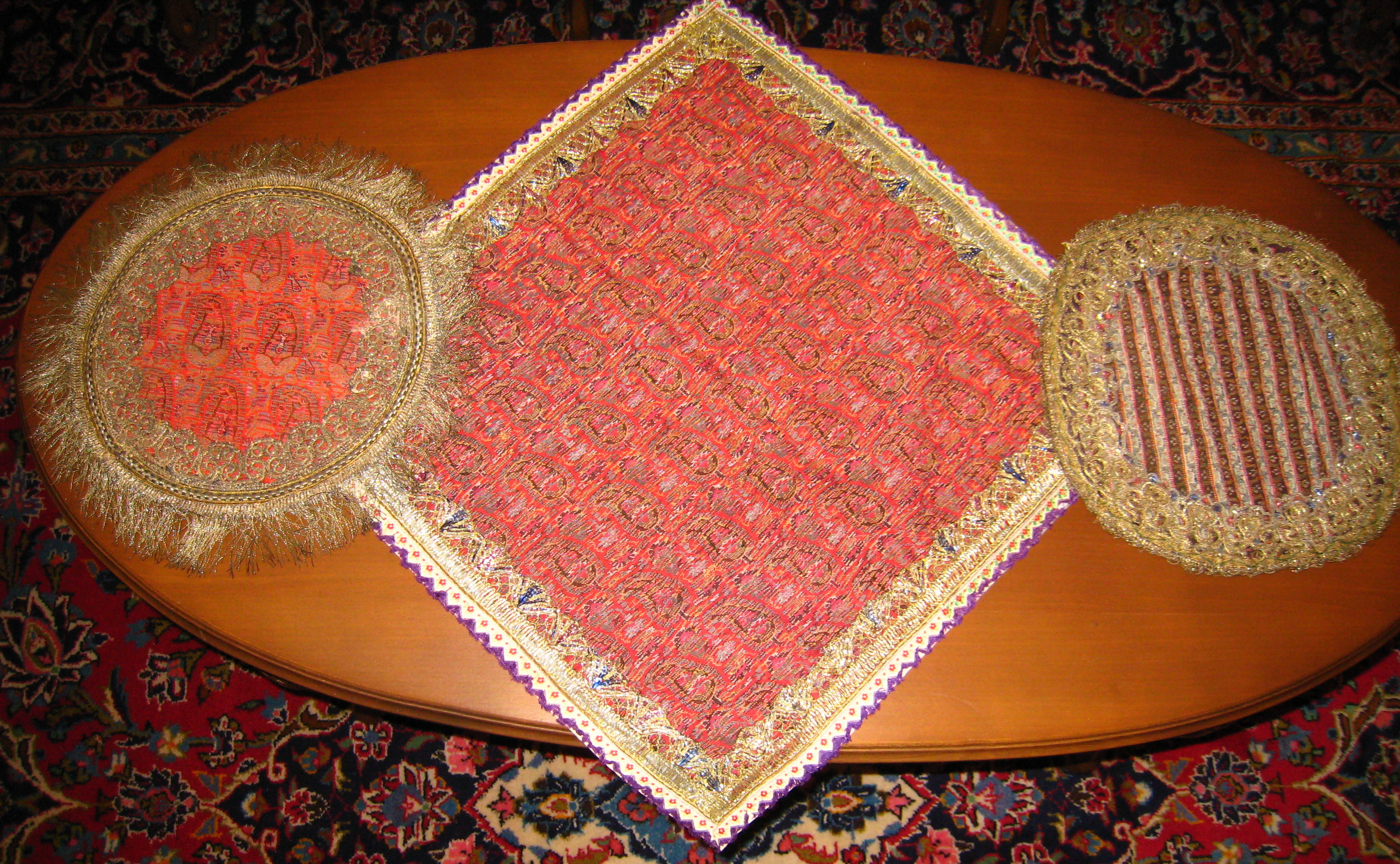
A sample of Termeh

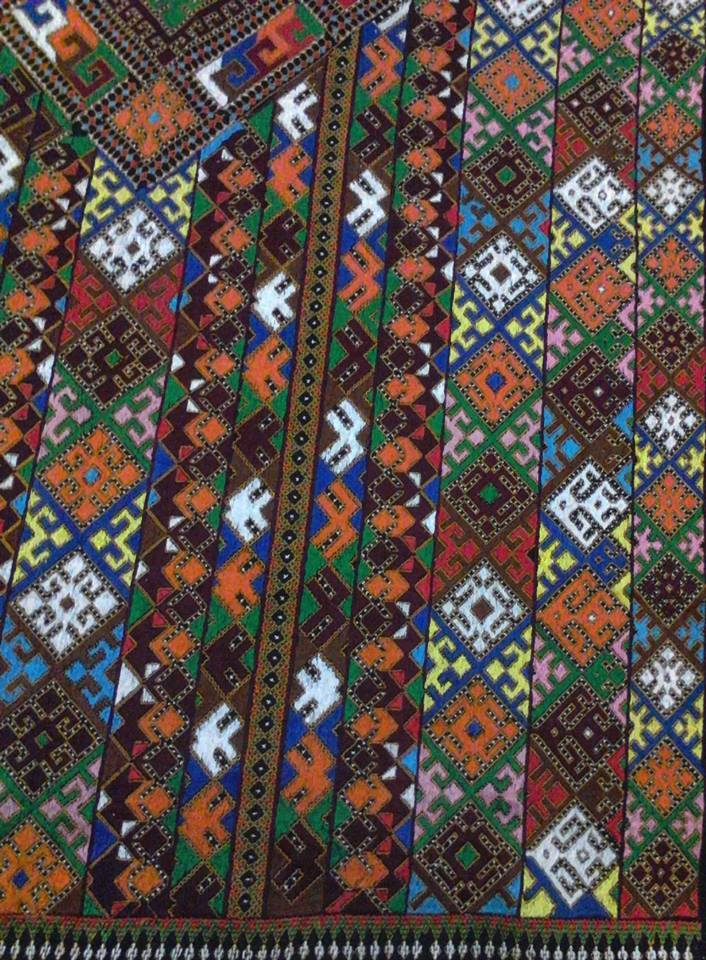
Iranian Baluchi embroidery

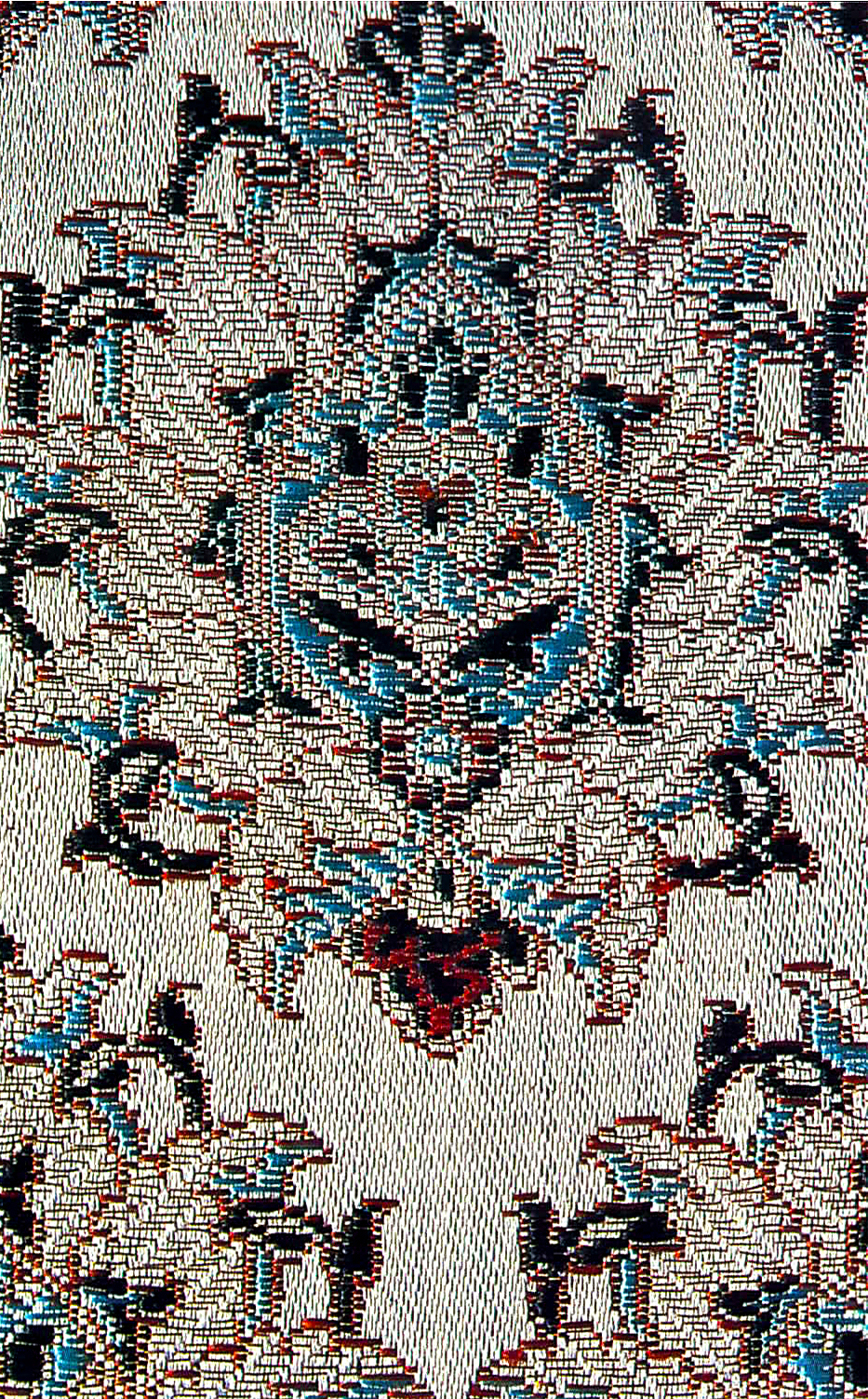
Persian silk brocade fabric with silver thread (Persian: Golabetoon)

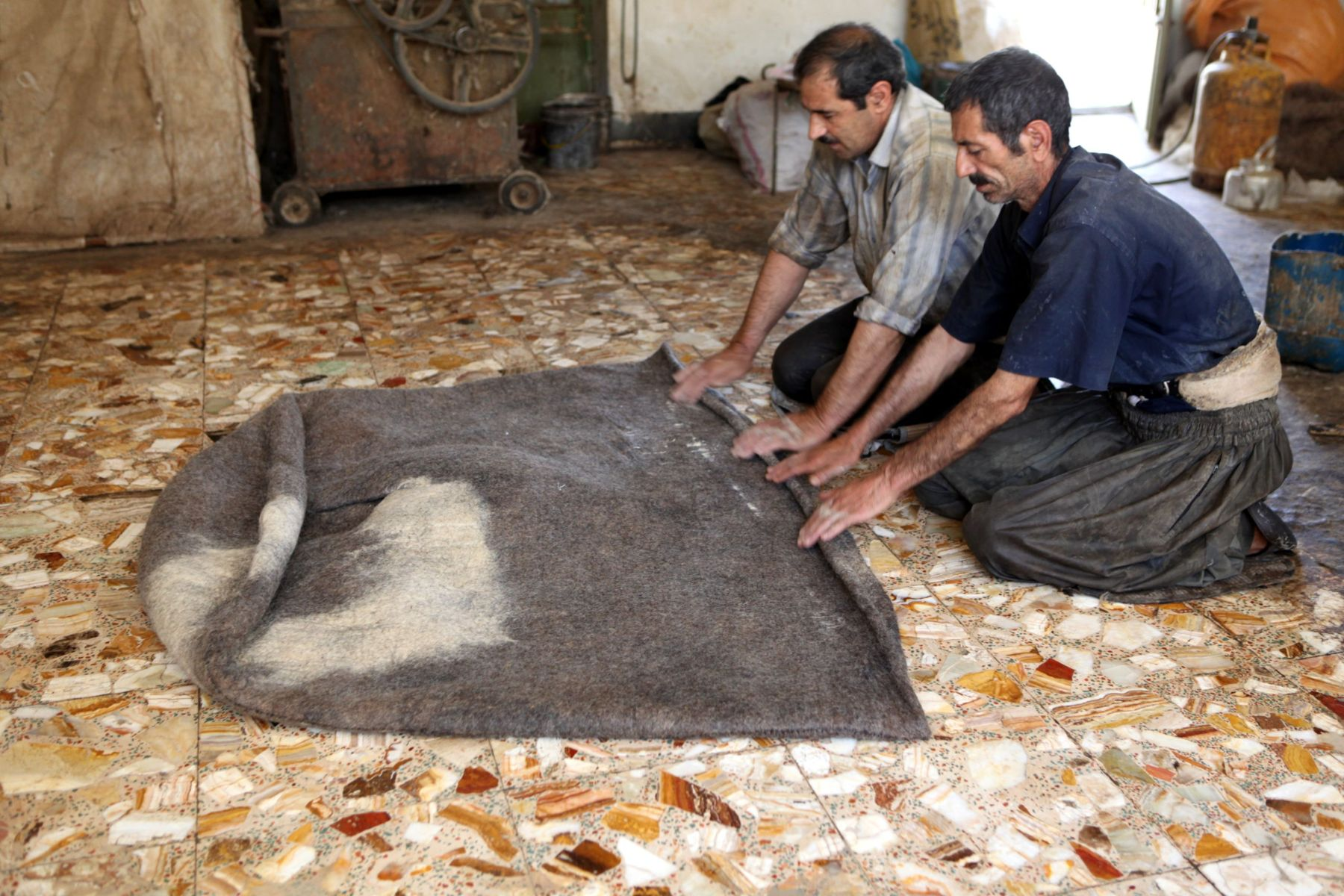
Bakhtiari felting in Shahr-e Kord

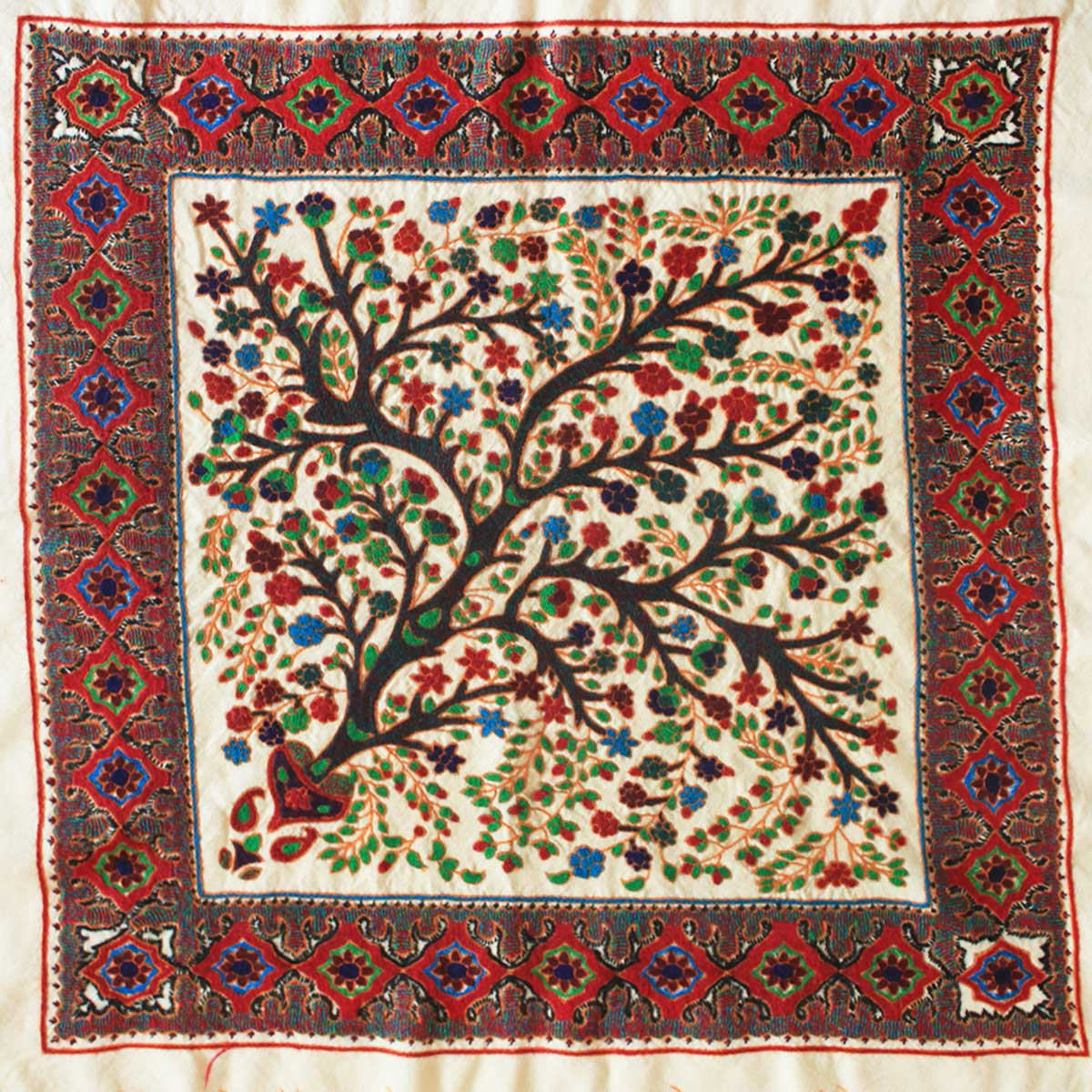
Pateh, needlework on wool

== Metalwork ==
- Dovatgari
- Enamelwork (Persian: Minakari)
- Metal engraving (Persian: Ghalam-Zani), also toreutics, and repoussé and chasing
- Openwork, a popular style for bronze work
- Silver-gilt
- Varshosazi, art of making products from nickel silver
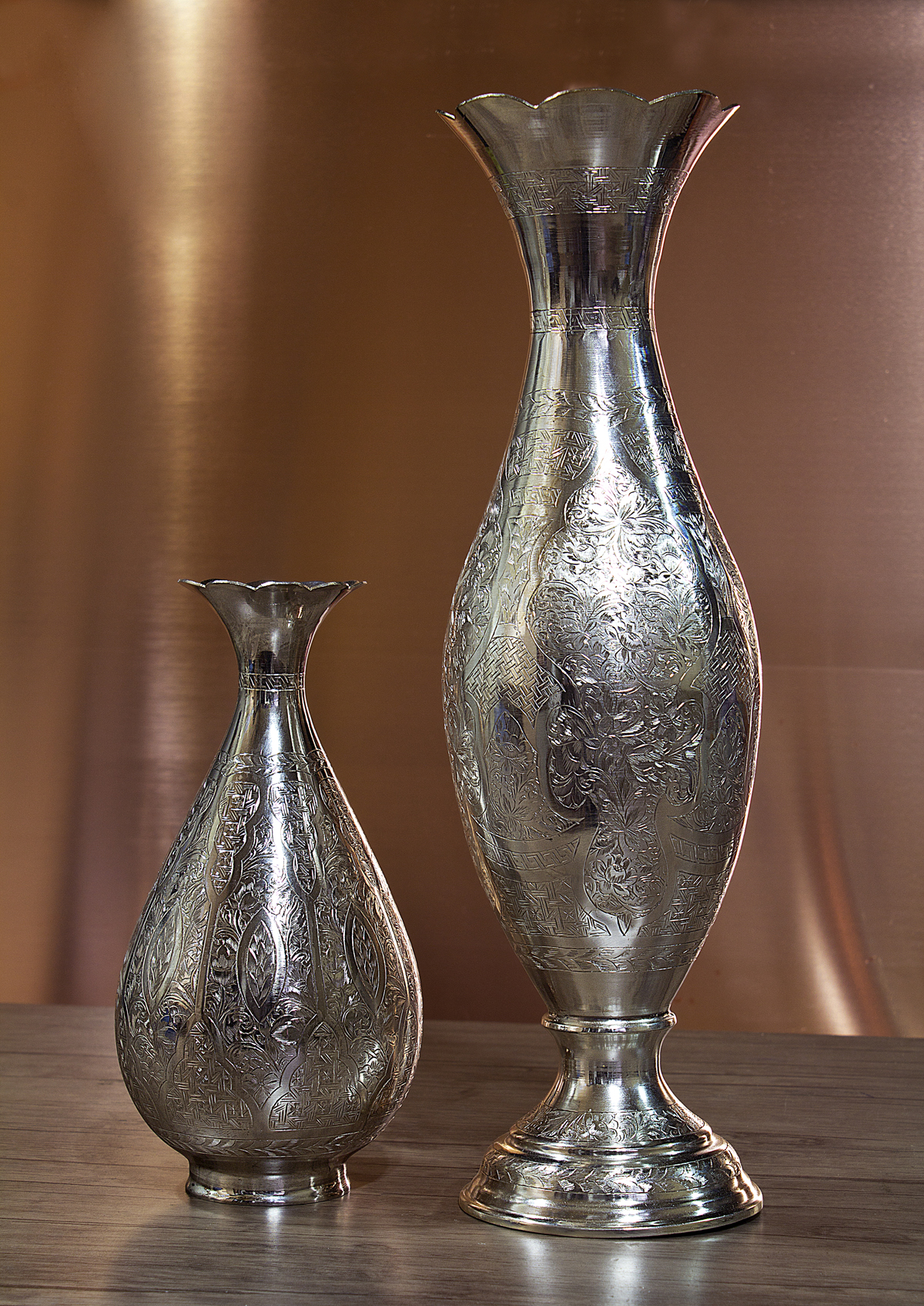
Tabriz-style copper

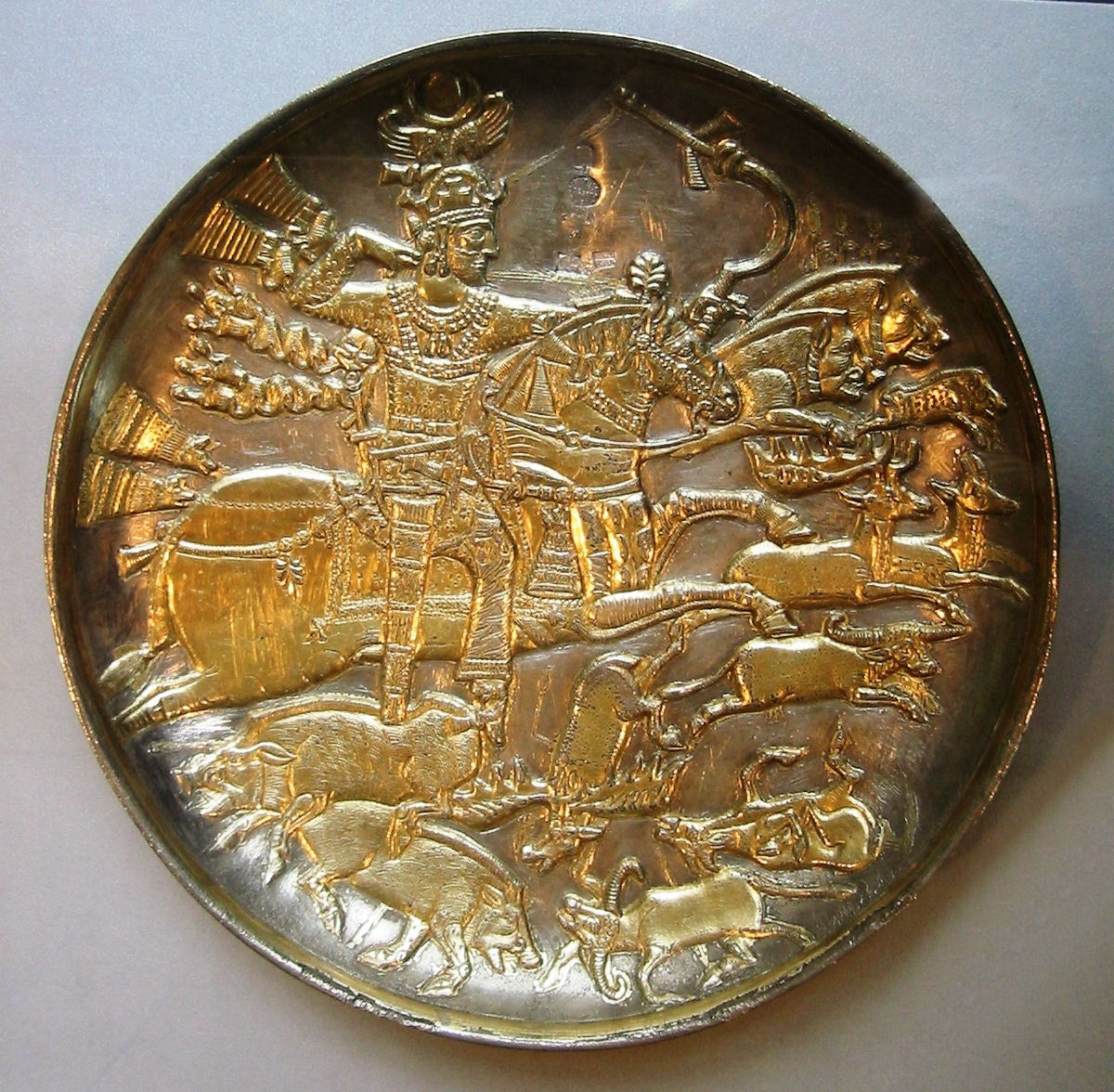
Persian metal engraving (golden plated), depicting Shah Anushirvan

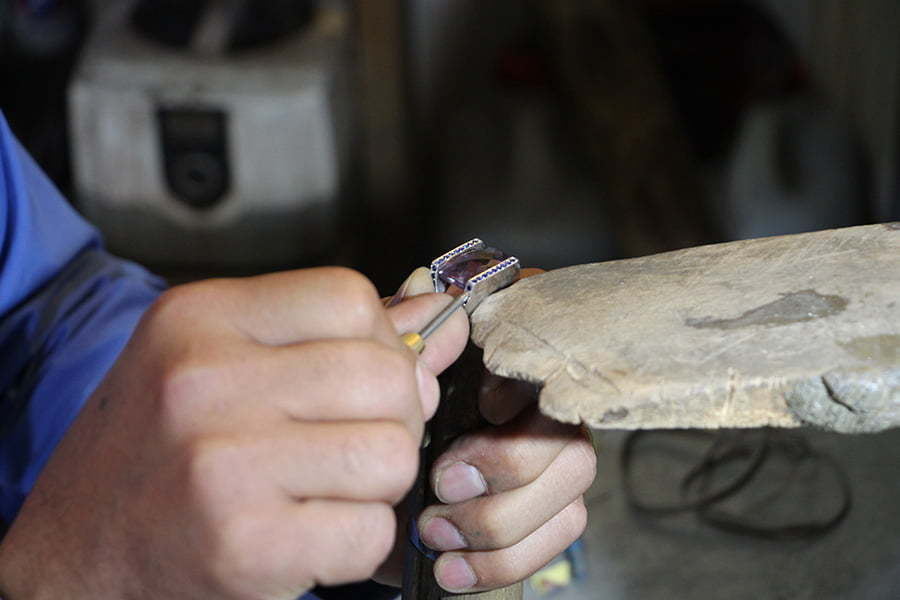
ring making in Qom province

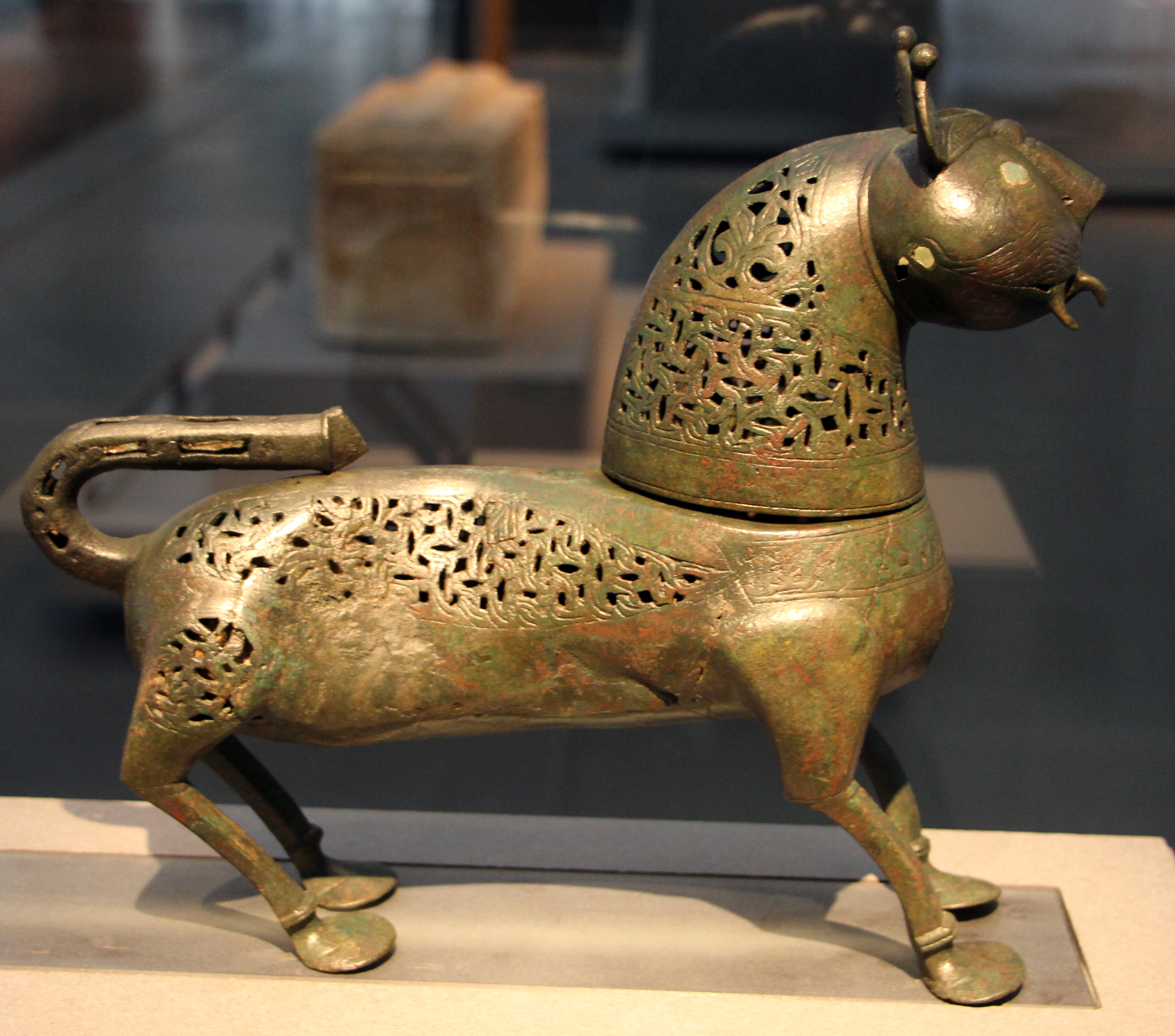
Openwork metal, incense burner, c. 11th century

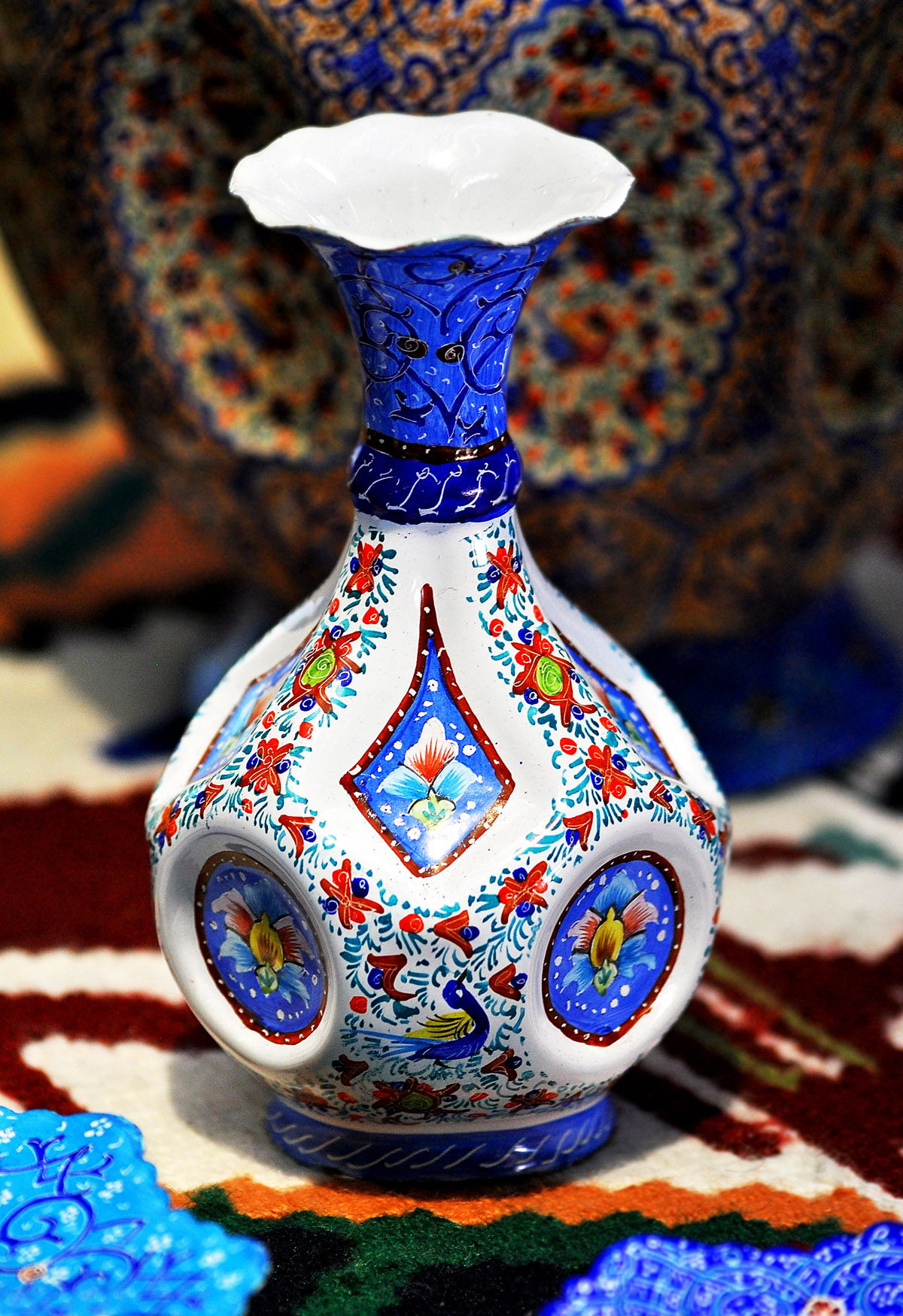
Enamelwork

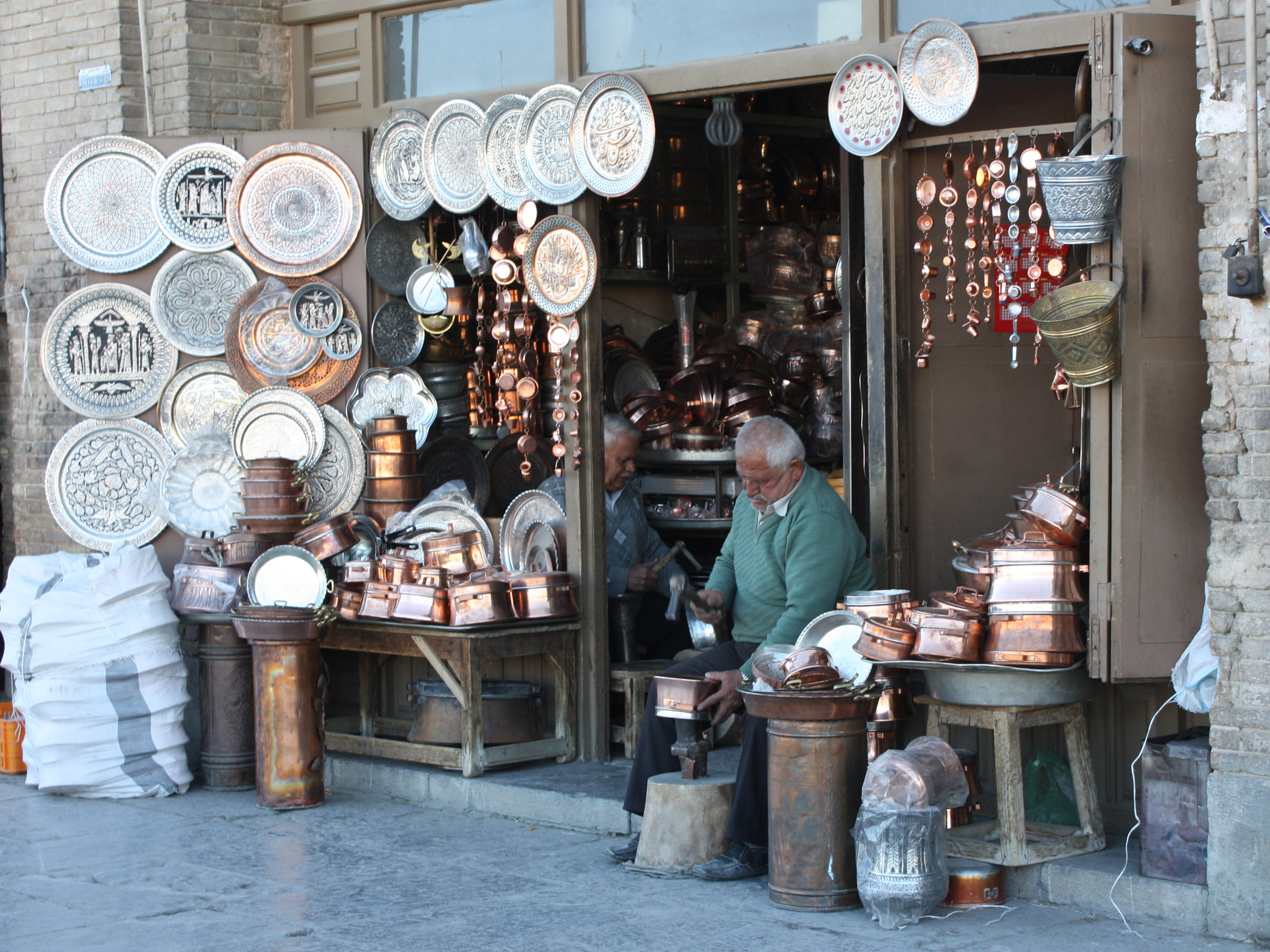
Store selling metalwork

== Woodwork ==
- Girih, a branch of traditional architecture and tiling strapwork, often made of wood, but sometimes made of other materials.
- Moarragh (also known as Moarraq), traditional marquetry or wood inlay
- Khatam, marquetry using very small pieces, often made into boxes or to decorate home goods
- Wood carving
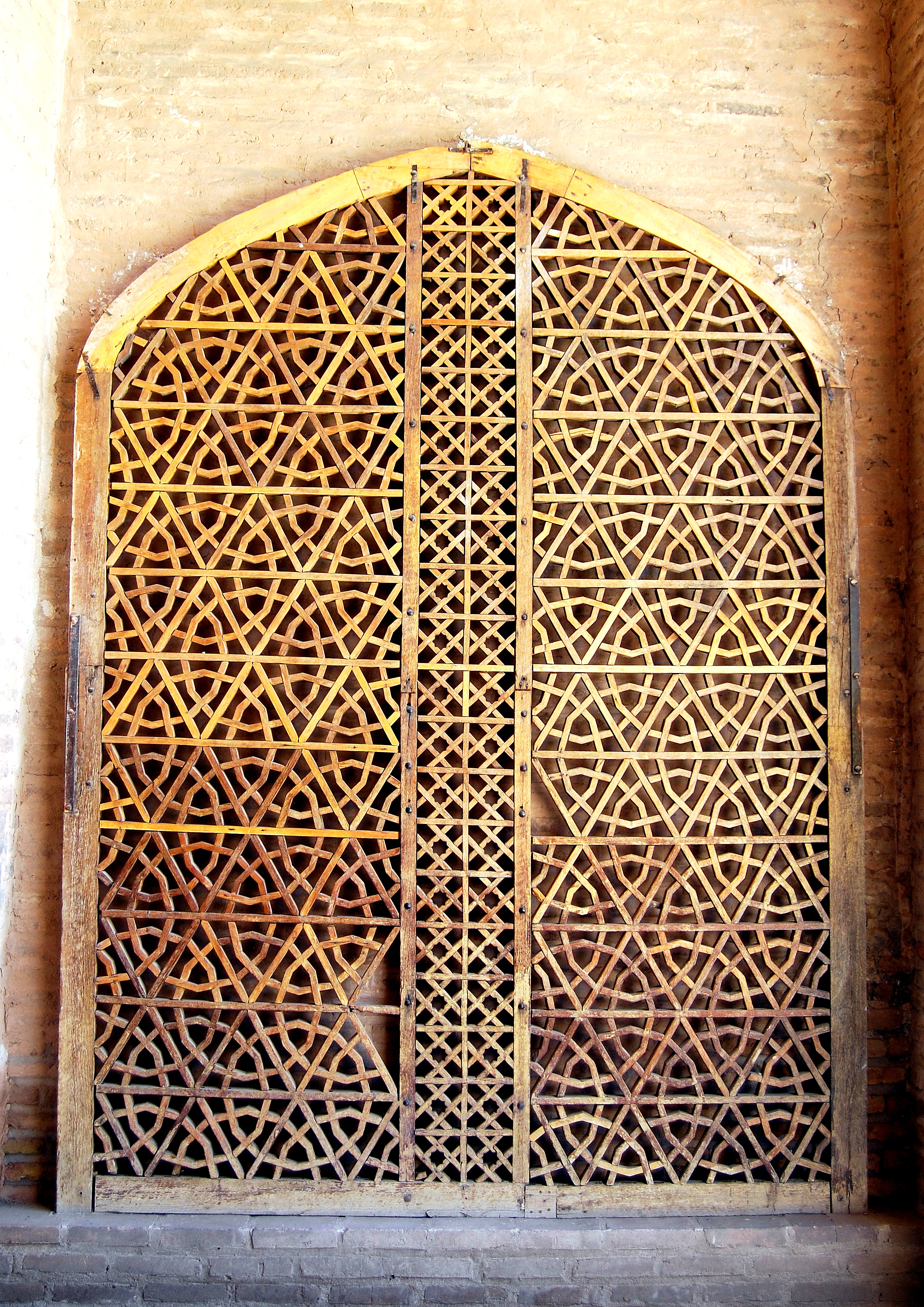
Girih screen found in Nishapur

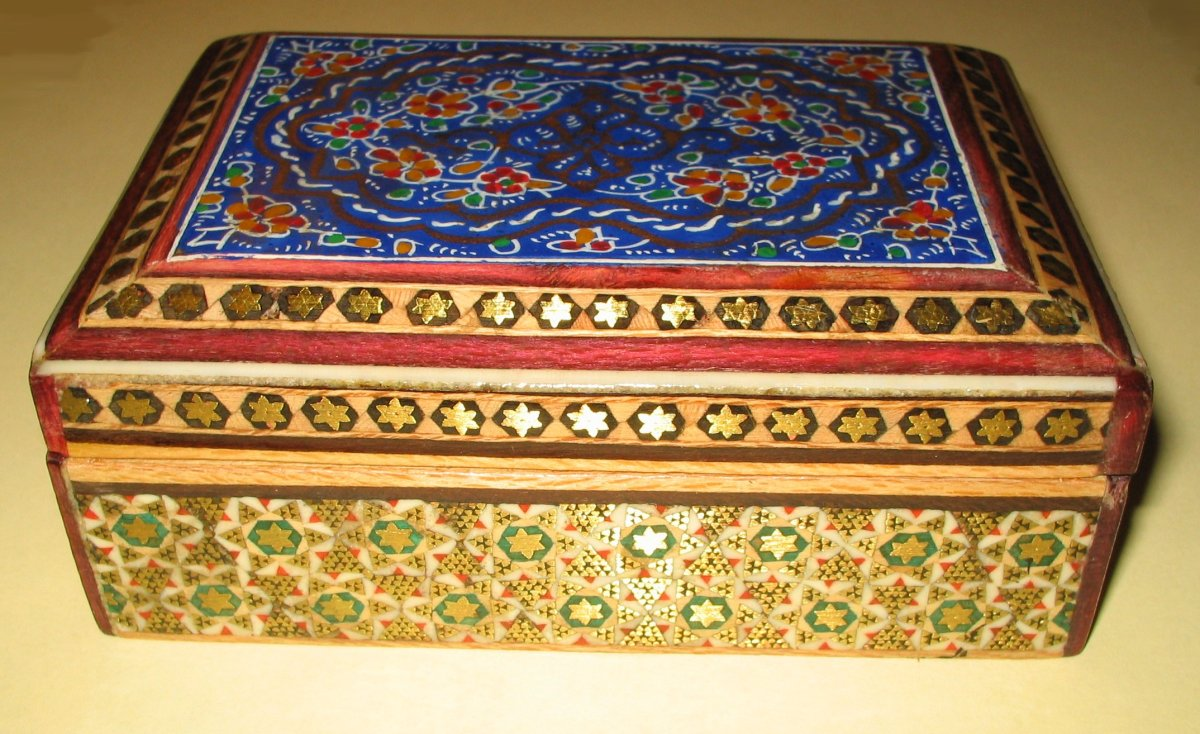
A sample of Khatam box

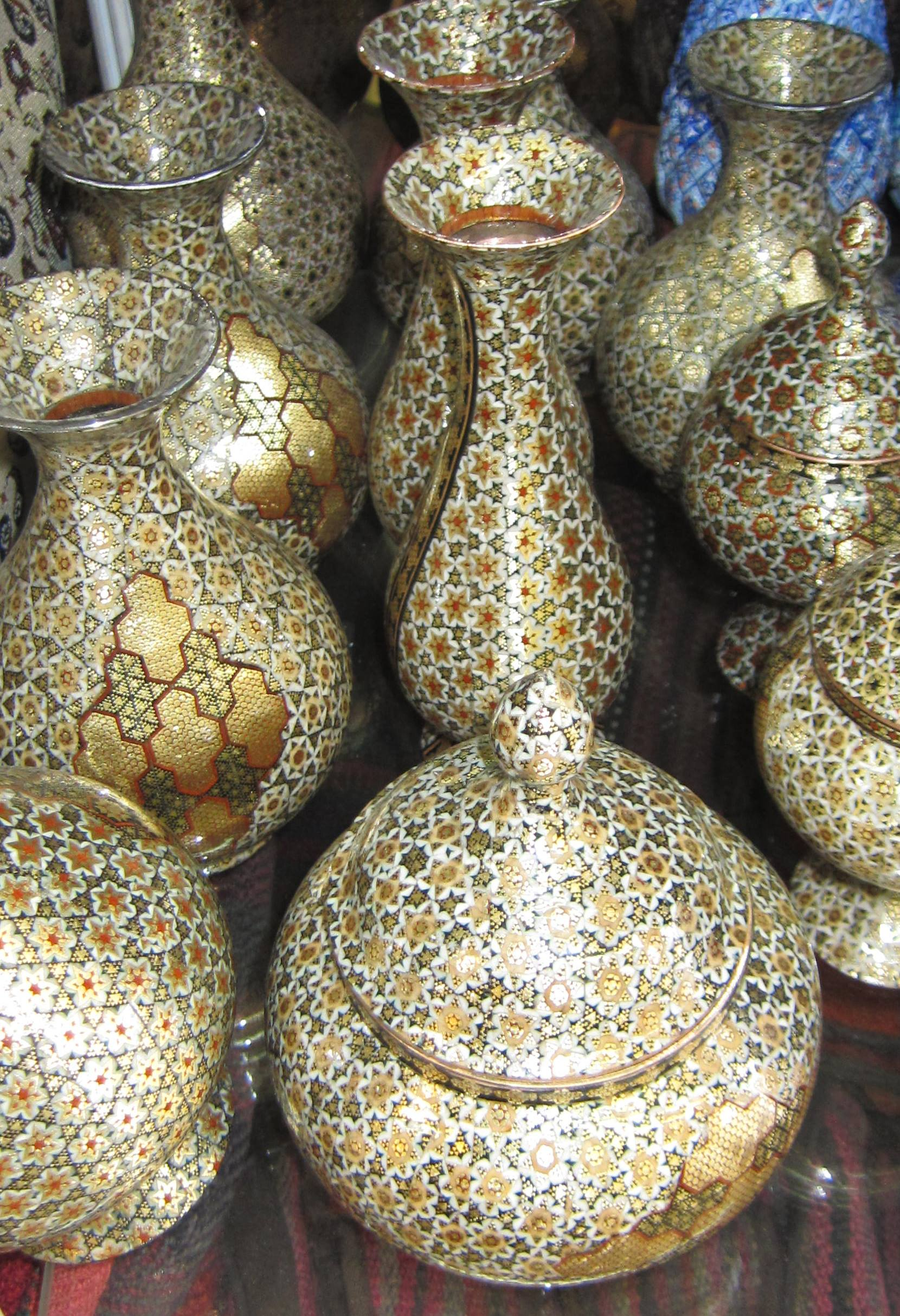
Khatam items

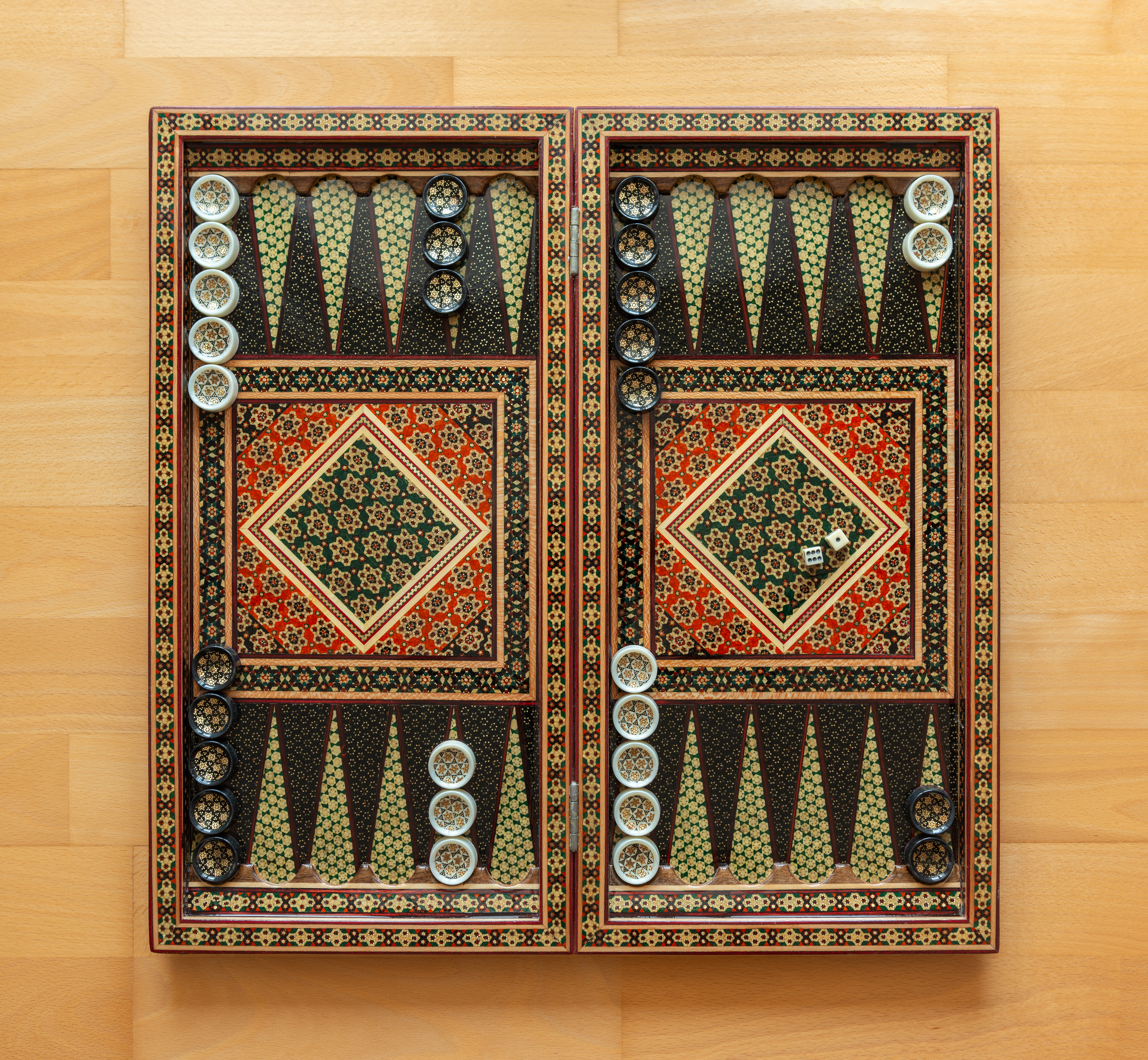
Backgammon (Nard) board made in Khatam technique.

== Pottery and ceramics ==
- Earthenware
- Fritware
- Garrus ware
- Gombroon ware
- Kraak ware
- Kubachi ware
- Lustreware
- Mina'i ware
- Moarragh, traditional ceramic mosaic tile developed by the Seljuks
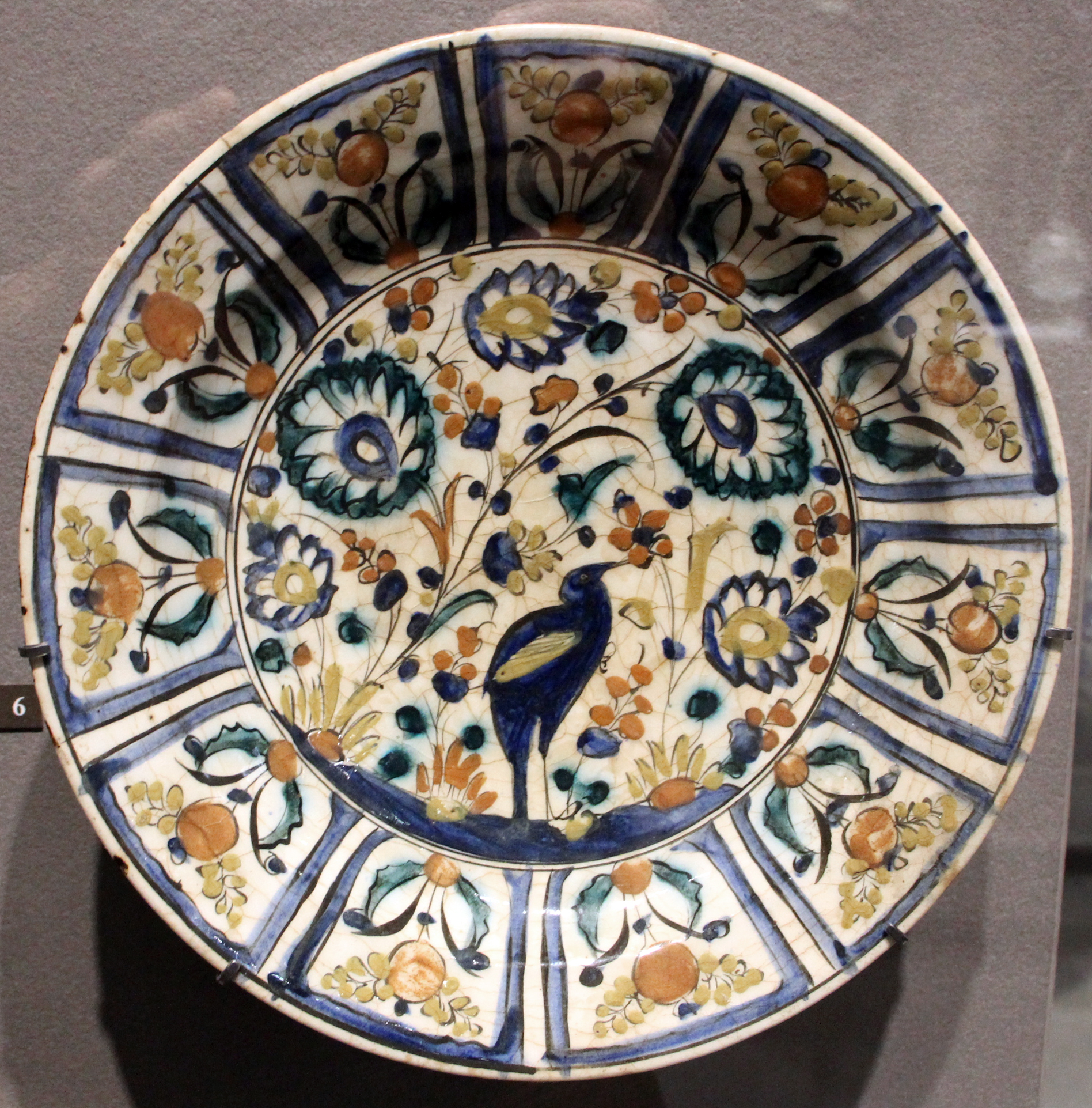
Persian Kraak ware

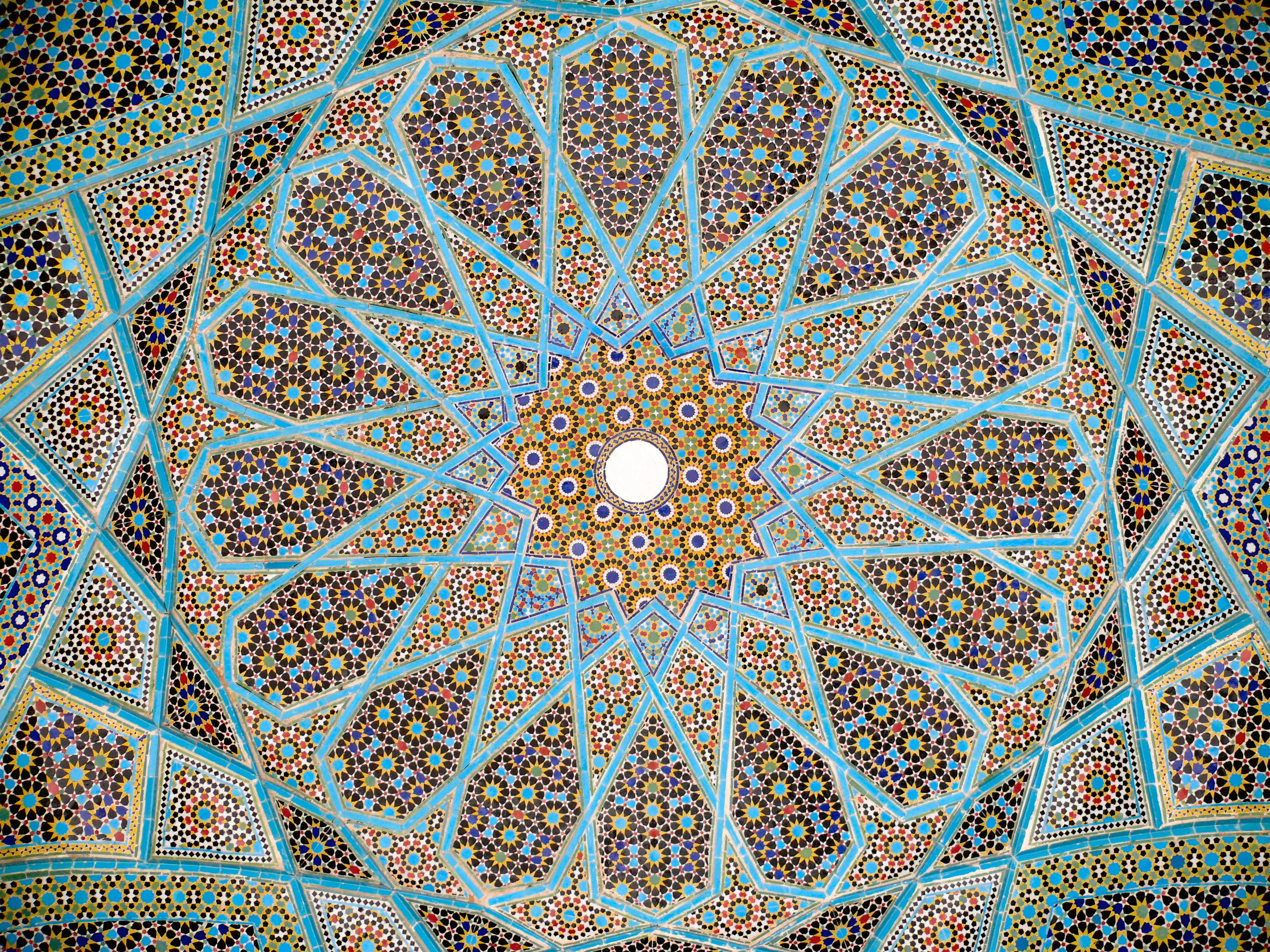
glazed ceramic tile work, from the ceiling of the Tomb of Hafez in Shiraz

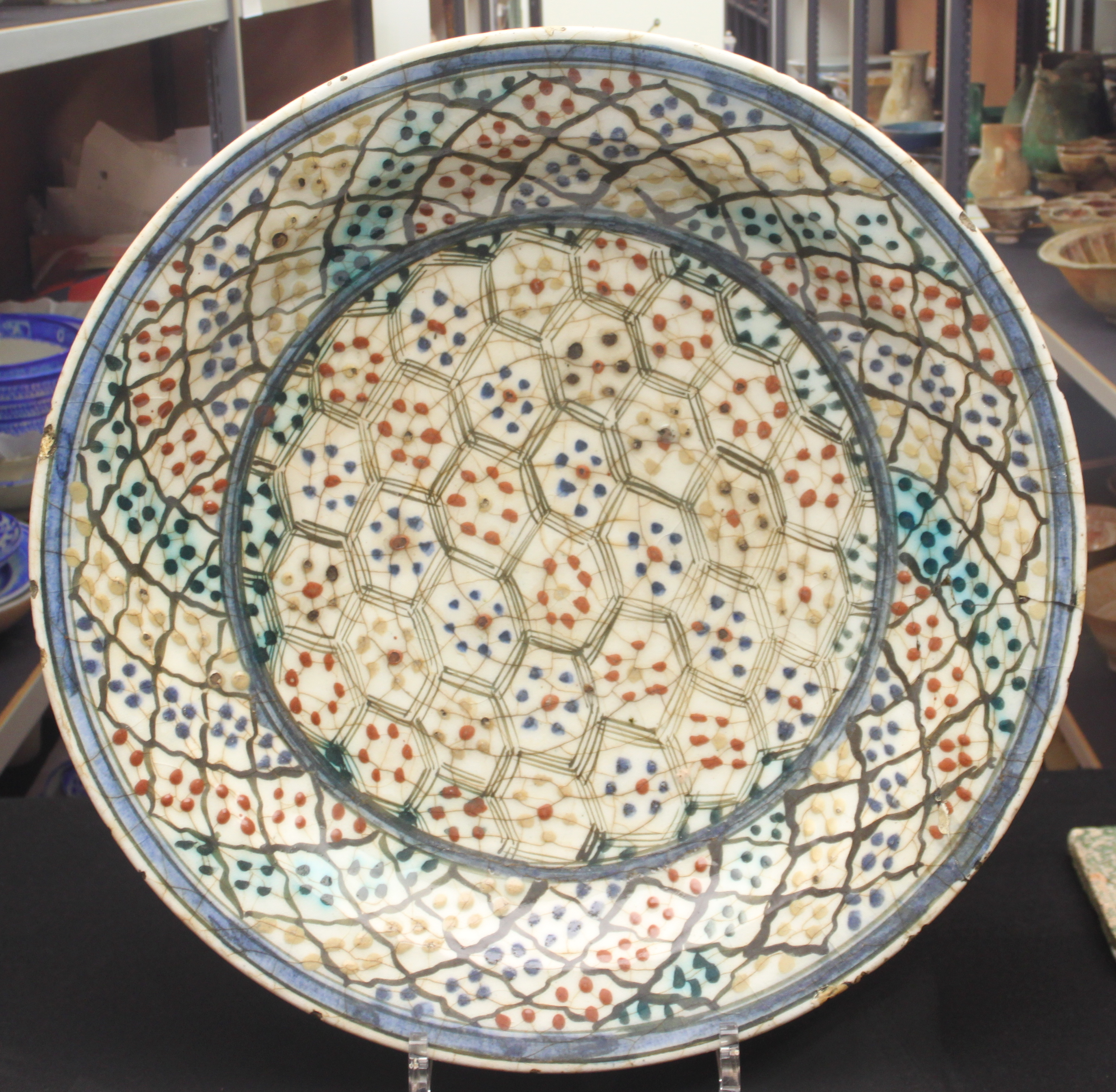
Kubachi ware

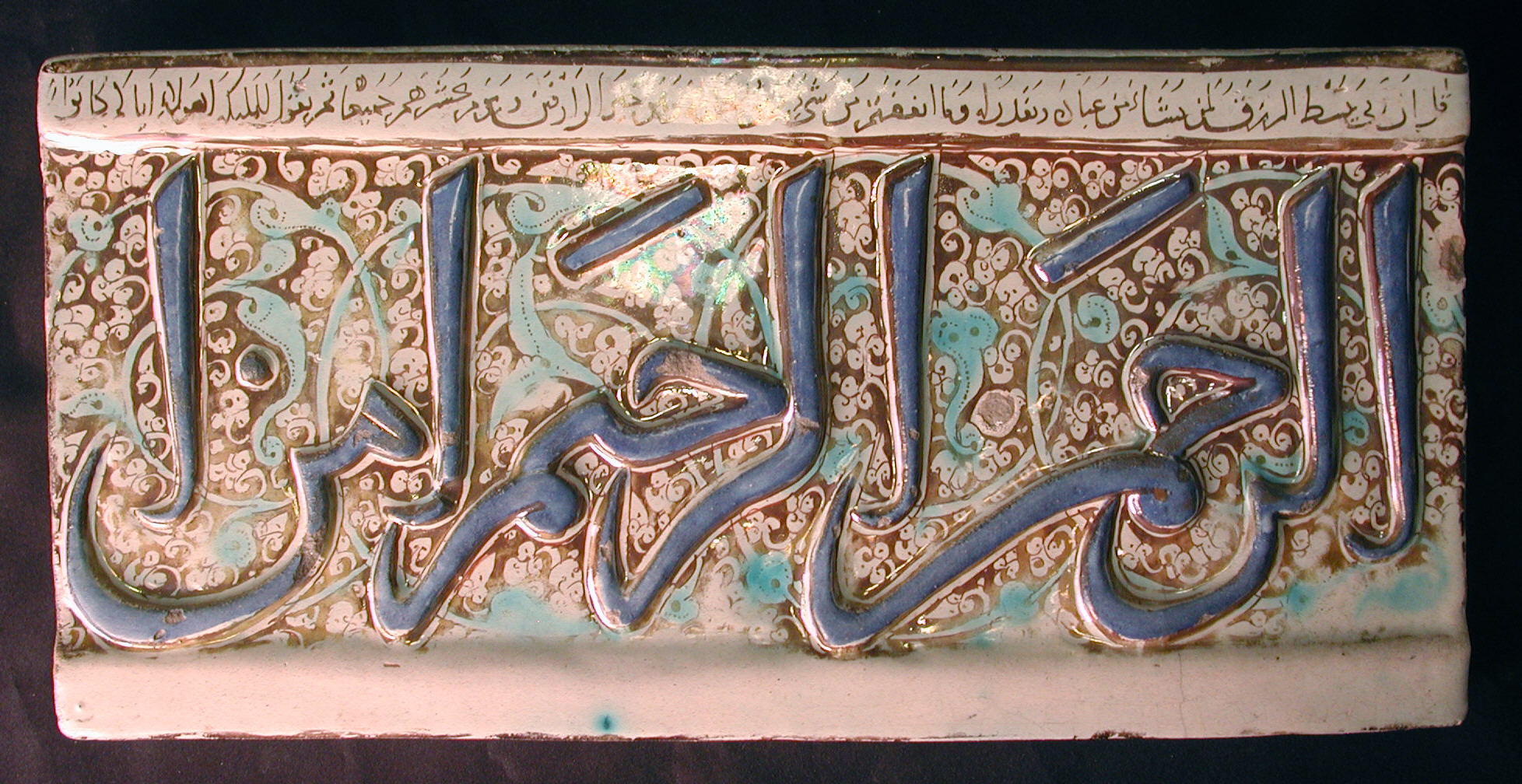
Lustreware

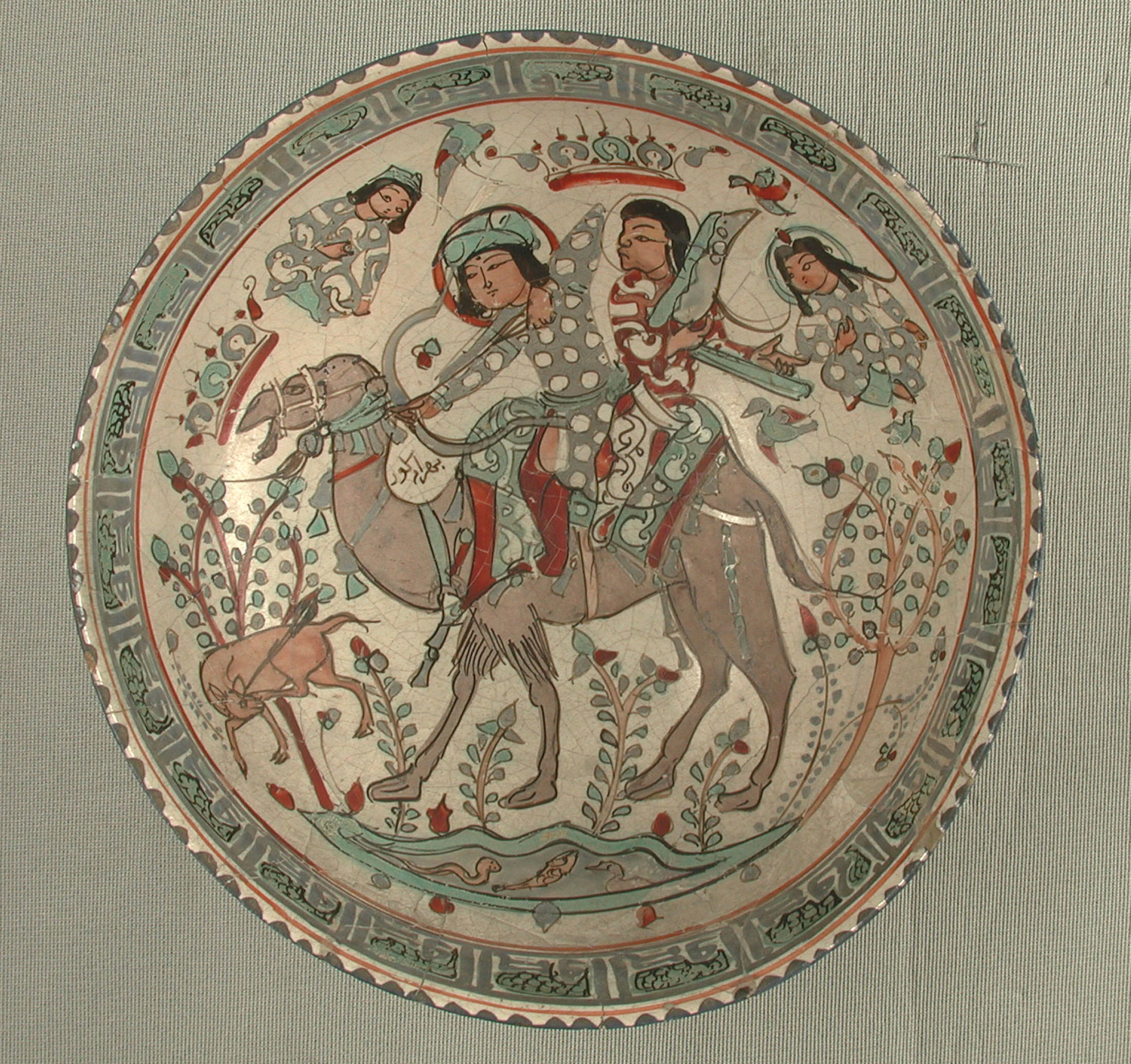
Mina'i ware

== Stone, mosaic, and masonry ==
- Chiq, a building material used inside the walls of nomadic black tents called "siah chador".
- Hardstone carving
- Sculpturing
- Stained glass (Orosi windows, or transliterated as Arasi, and Orsi)
- Firoozeh Koobi, made of a copper vessel that is covered with inlayed turquoise stone.
- Stone inlay, the most popular stone used is carnelian, followed by turquoise to make traditional jewelry. The inlay is typically laid in mastic and wax, then fixed with enamel and/or niello.
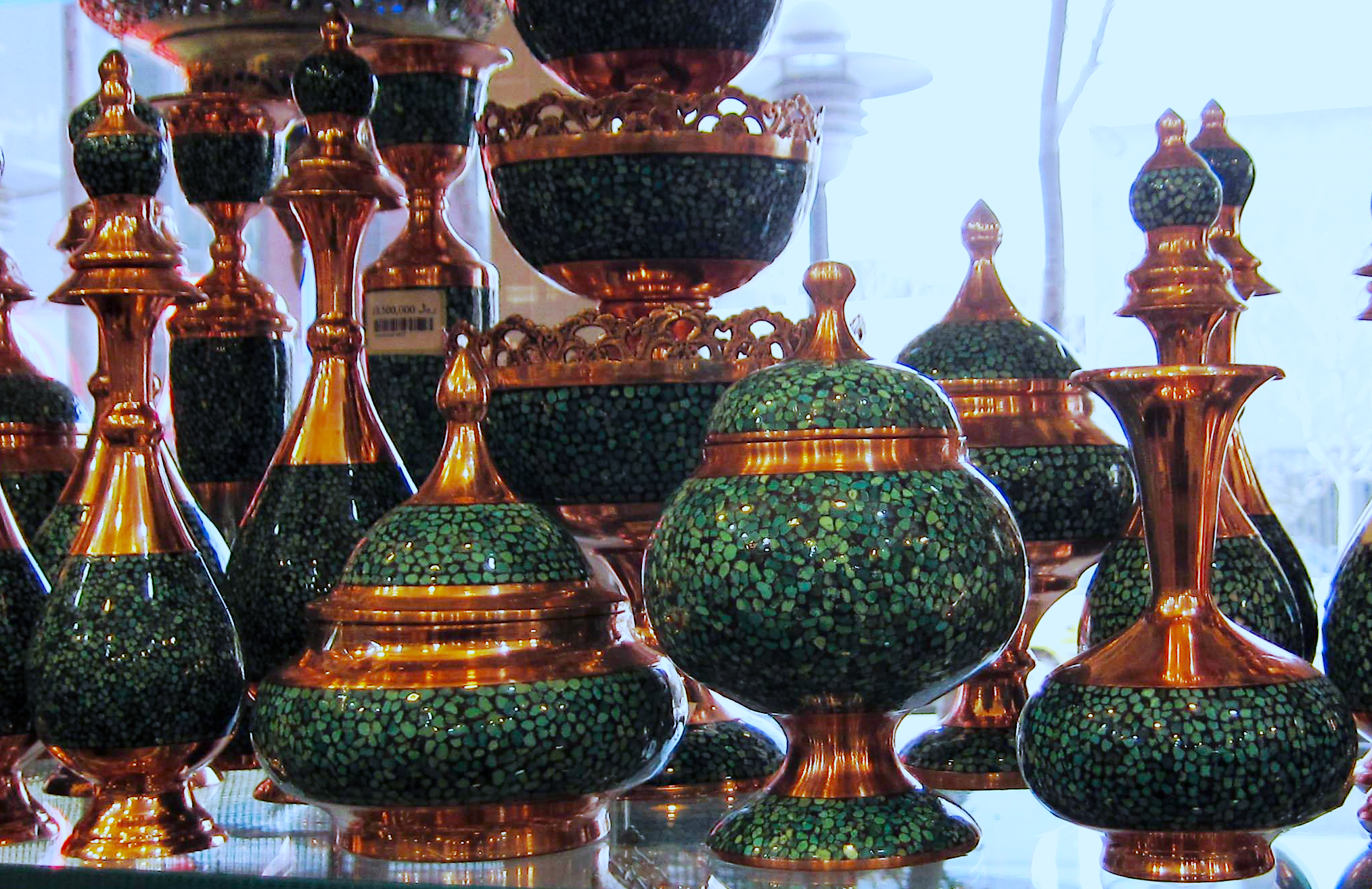
Firoozeh koobi or Persian turquoise inlay

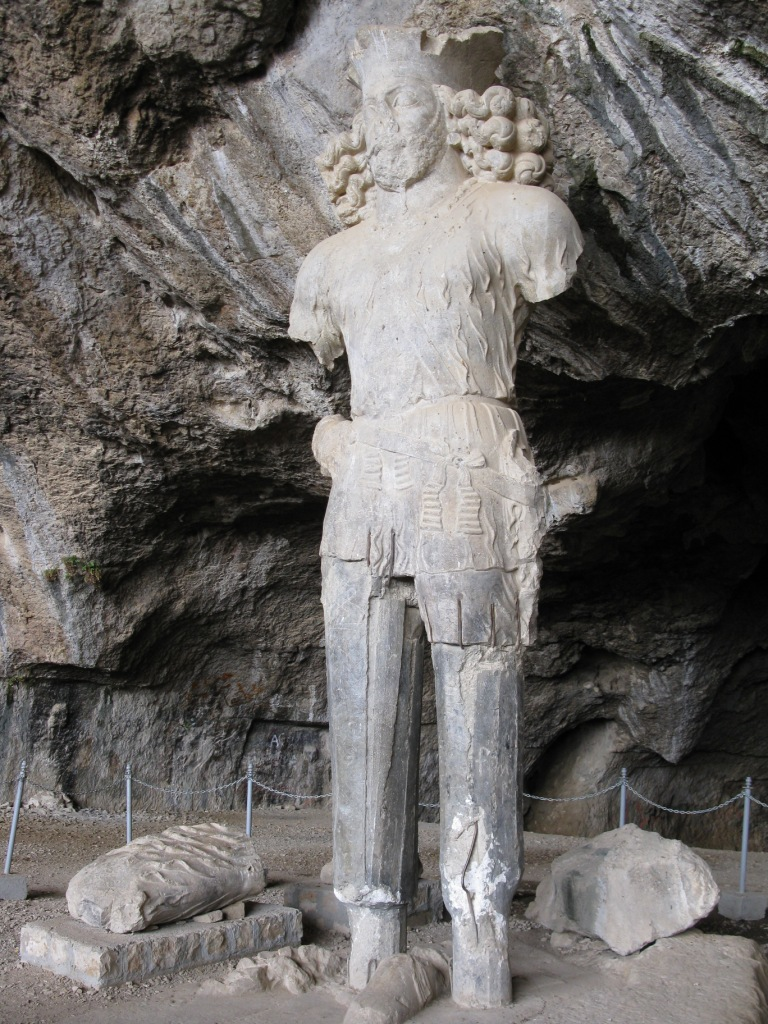
Colossal Statue of Shapur I, example of traditional statuary stone carving

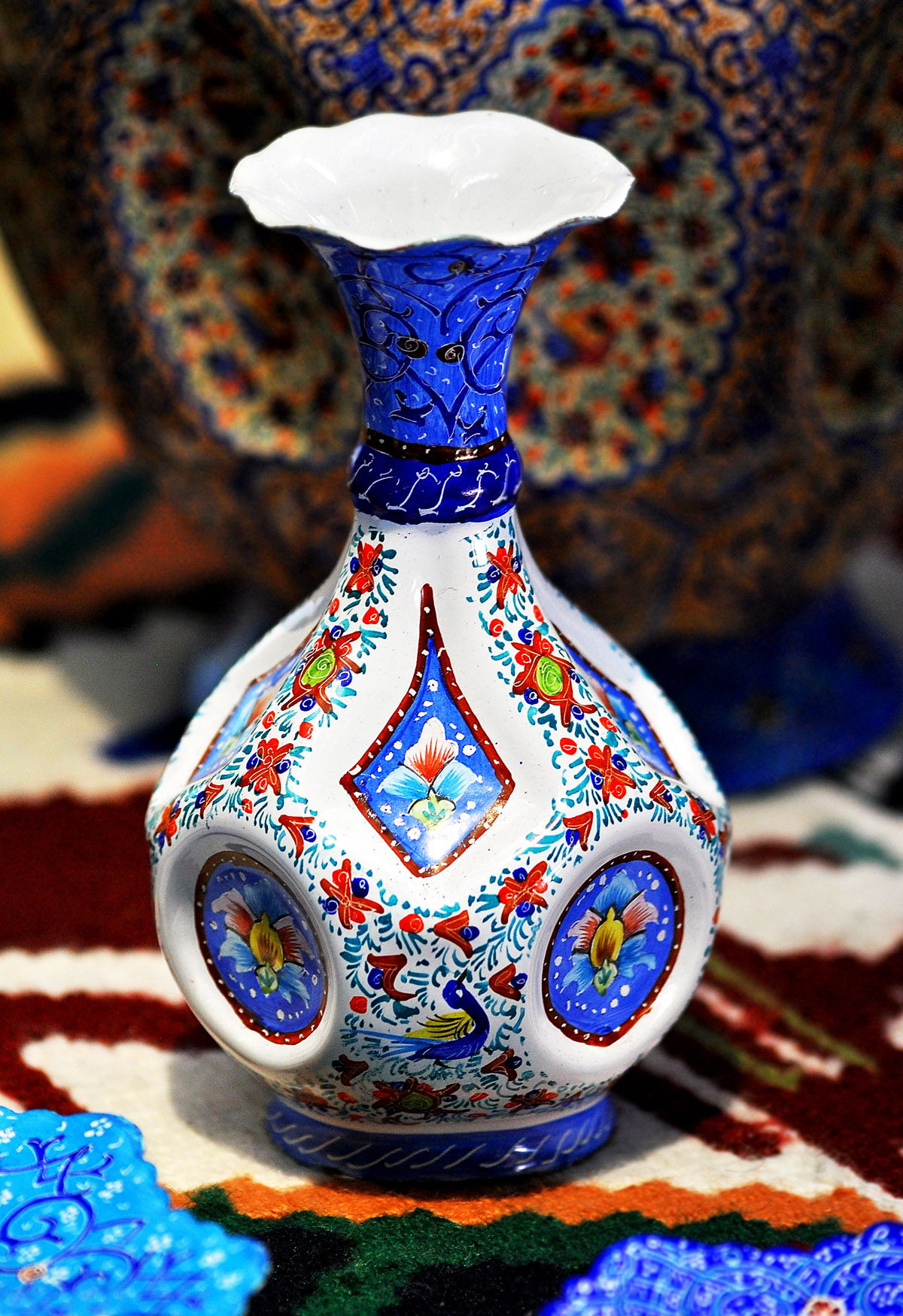
Enameled vase

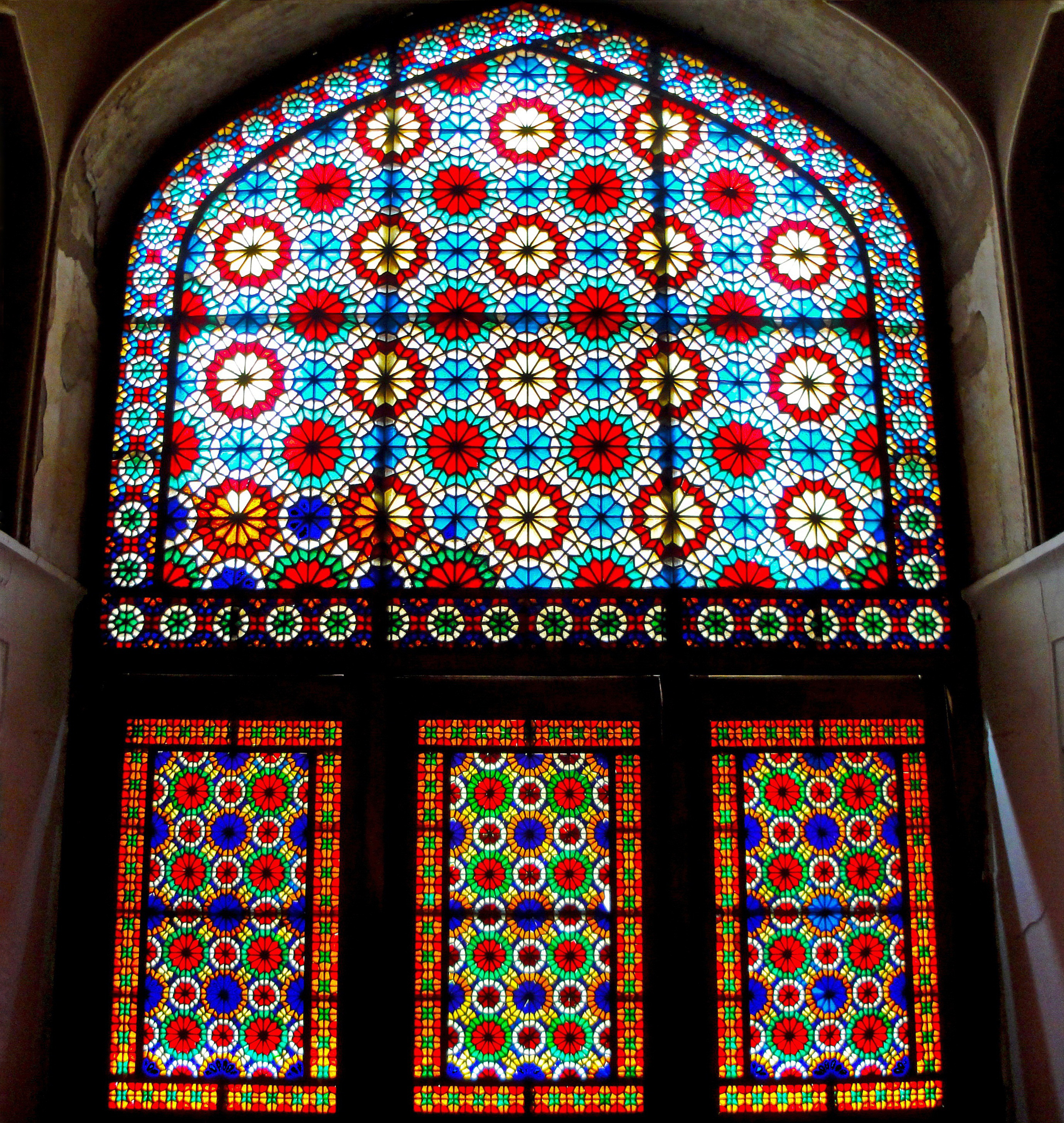

== Painting, drawing, and motifs ==
- Persian miniature
- Motifs
  - Buta (ornament), a motif style
  - Gol o Bolbol, a flower-and-bird motif style
  - Paisley (design), a motif style
  - Master of Animals
  - Lion and Sun
- Illuminated manuscript
- Tashir (craft), a gilding and painting technique
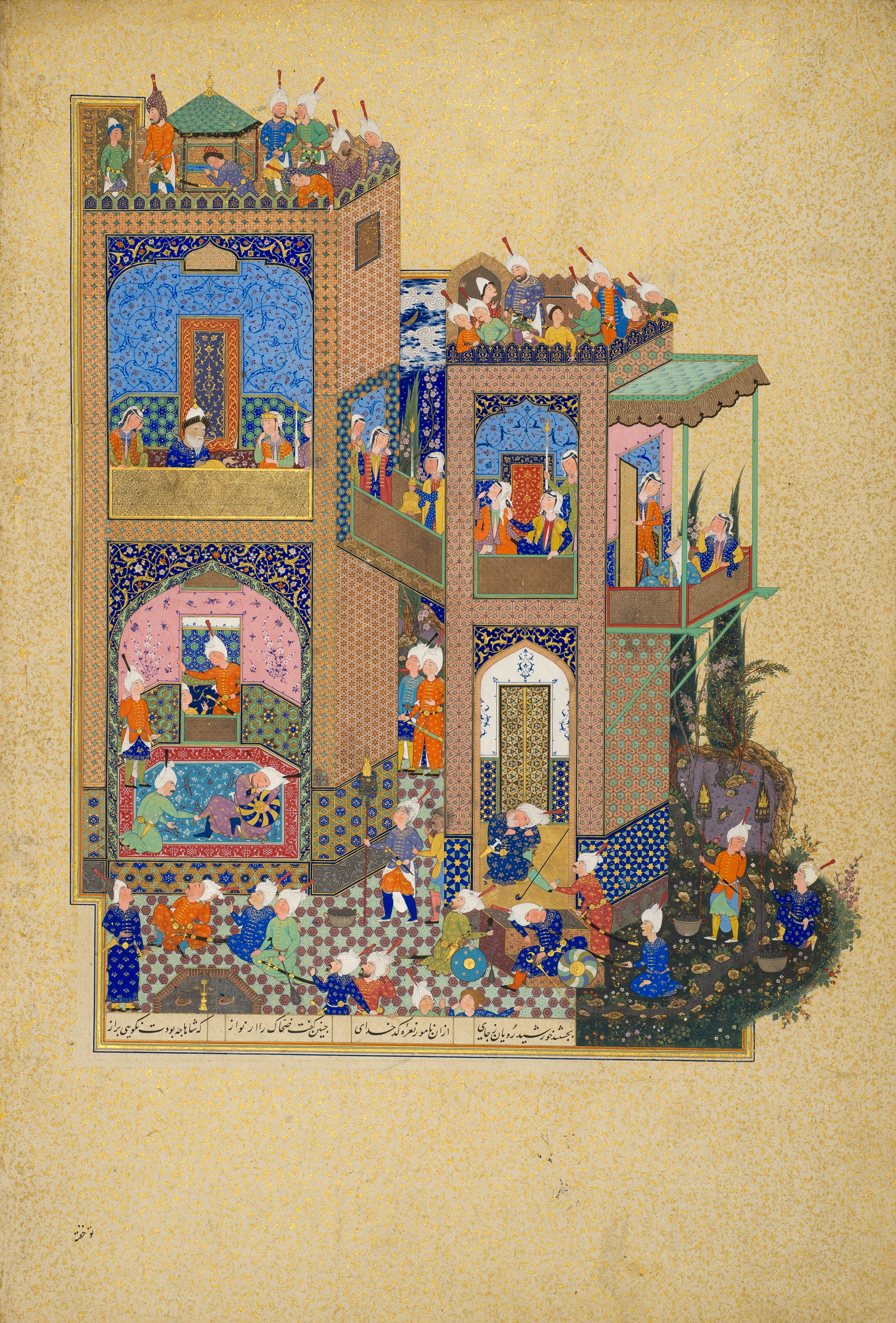
example of a Persian miniature, "The Nightmare of Zahhak" (c. 1525–1535)

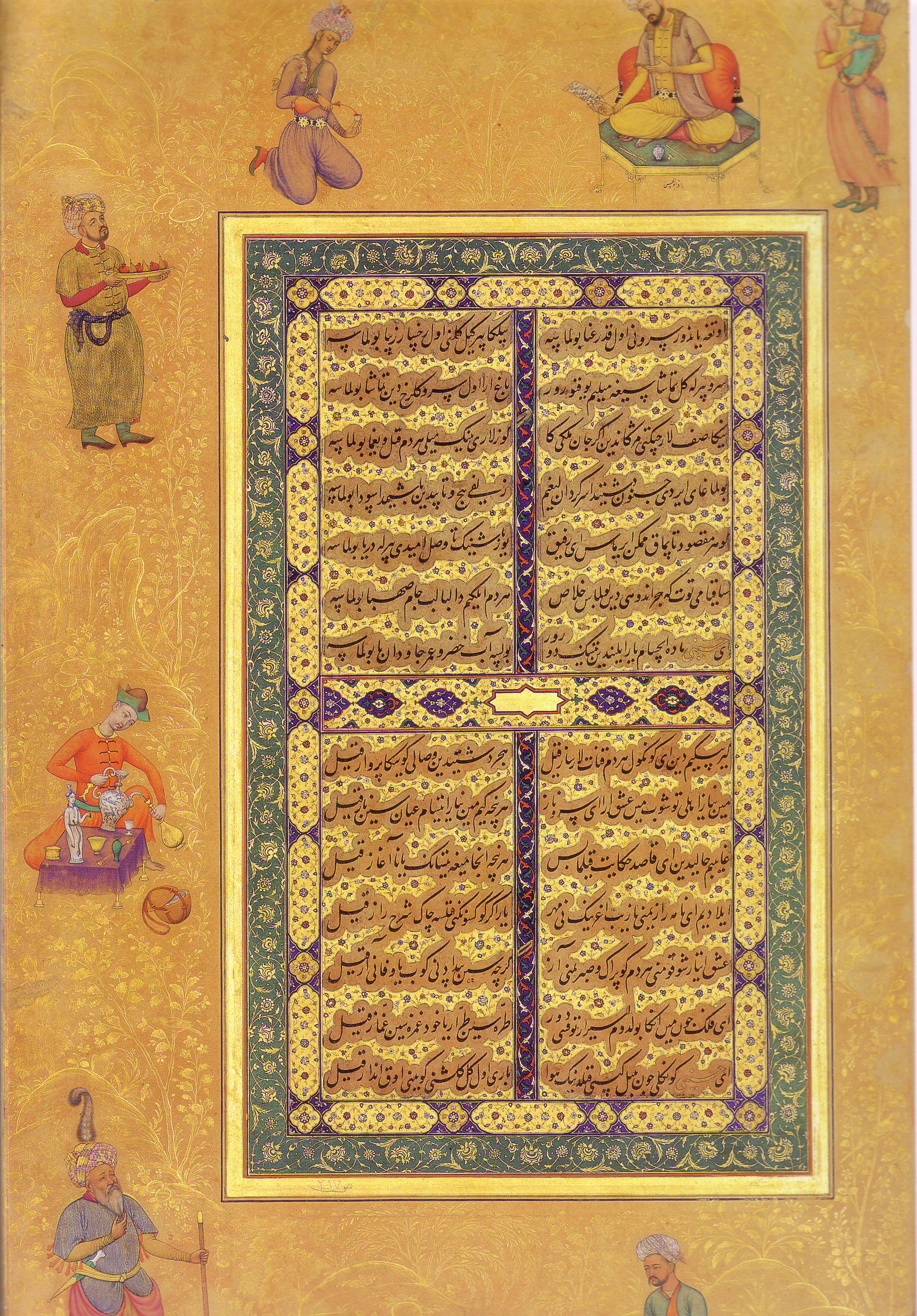
example of Tashir

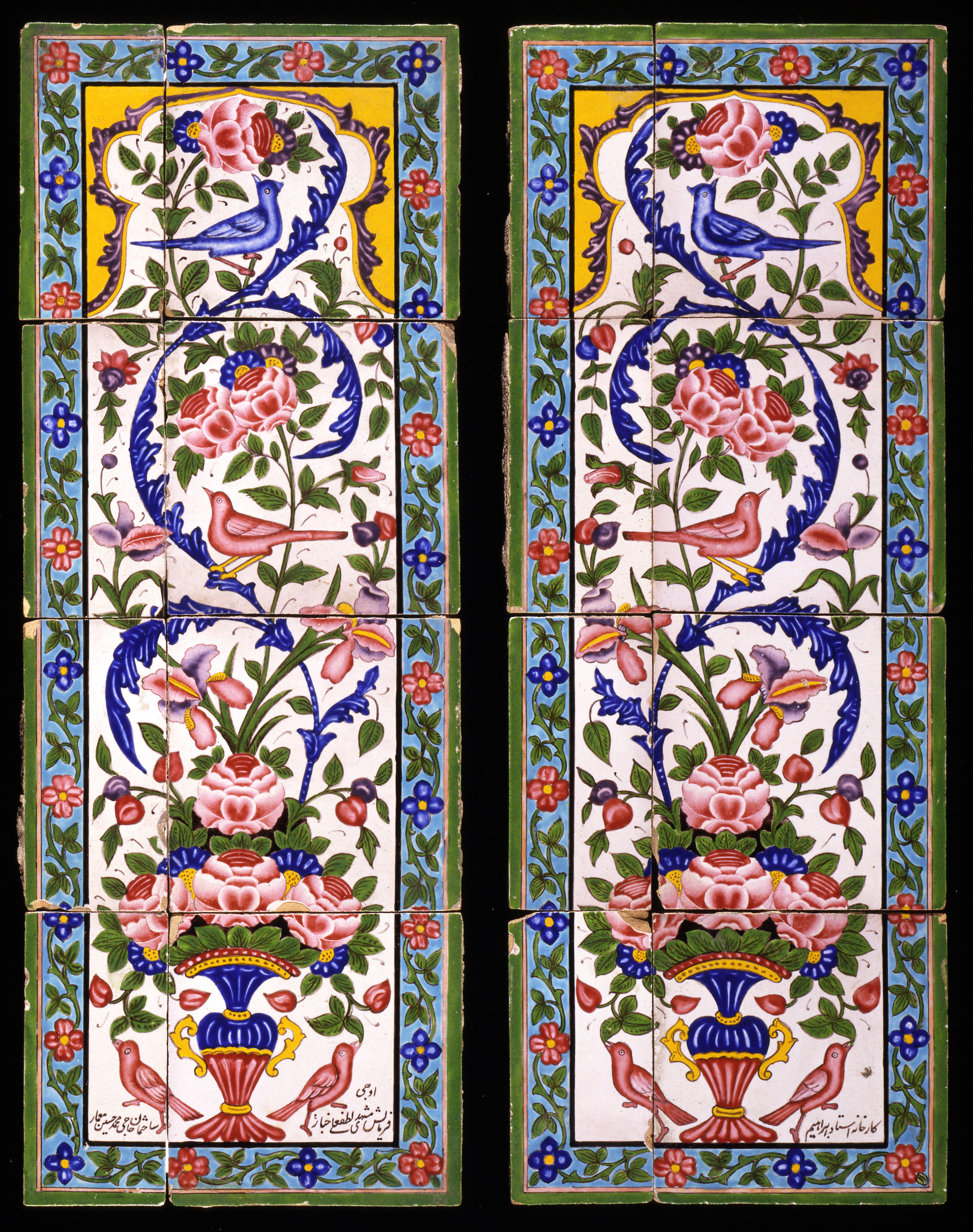
Gol o bolbol motif on earthenware tiles, from the Qajar-era

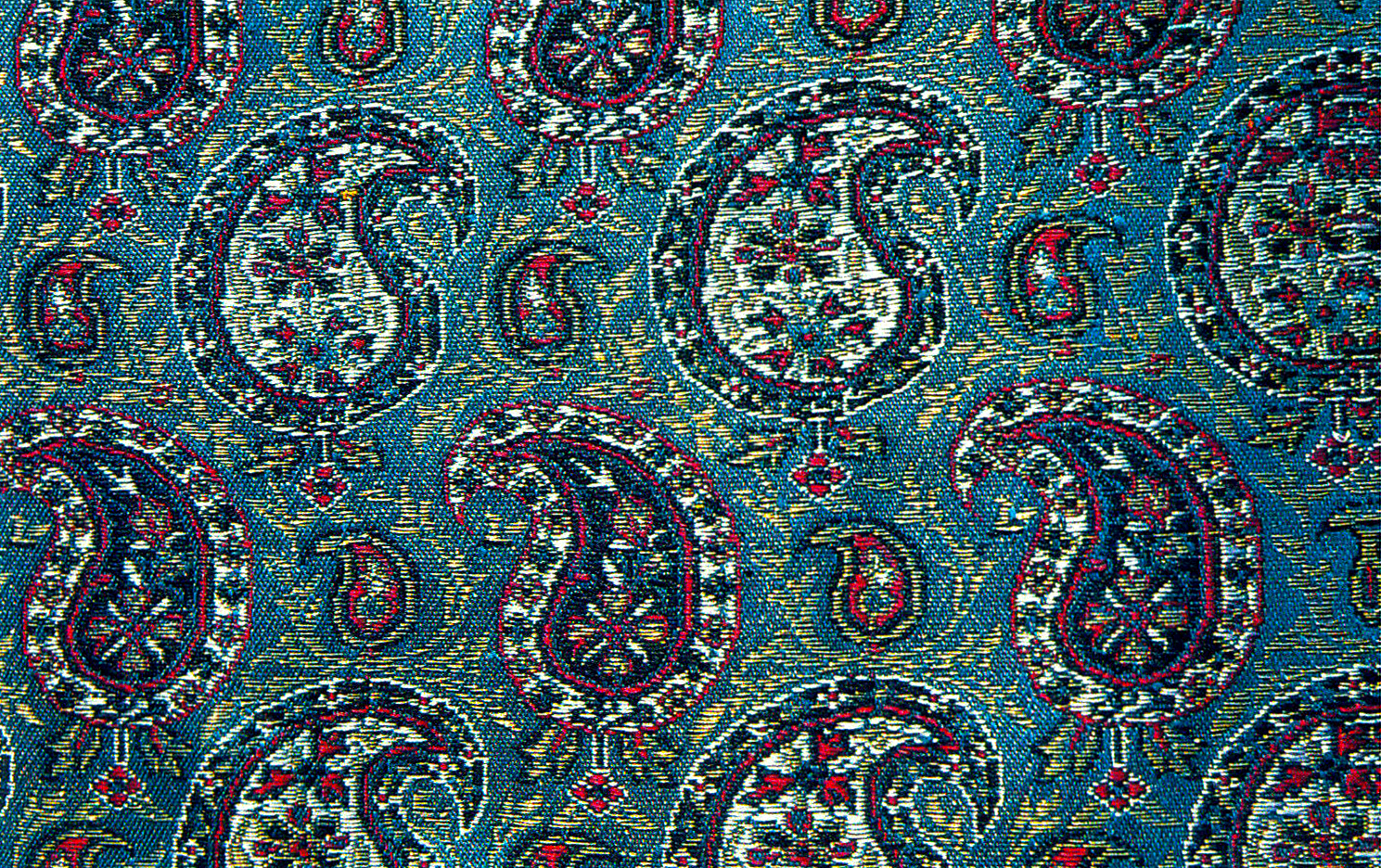
Persian silk brocade with silver and gold thread, with paisley pattern

== Places in Iran to find handicrafts ==
- Grand Bazaar, Tehran
- Vakil Bazaar, Shiraz
- Bazaar-e Bozorg, Isfahan
- Tabriz Grand Bazaar, Tabriz
- Fire Temple of Yazd

== See also ==
- Arts of Iran
- Persian art
- Persian-Sassanid art patterns
