= Uzbek Julkhyr =

Type of rug in Uzbekistan

Uzbek Julkhyr is a type of rug made primarily in Uzbekistan.

It is a long, coarsely woven sleeping rug. It was also made by the Uzbek in northern Afghanistan. They are similar in use and construction to old gabbeh carpets.
