= Firoozeh Koobi =

Iranian handicraft

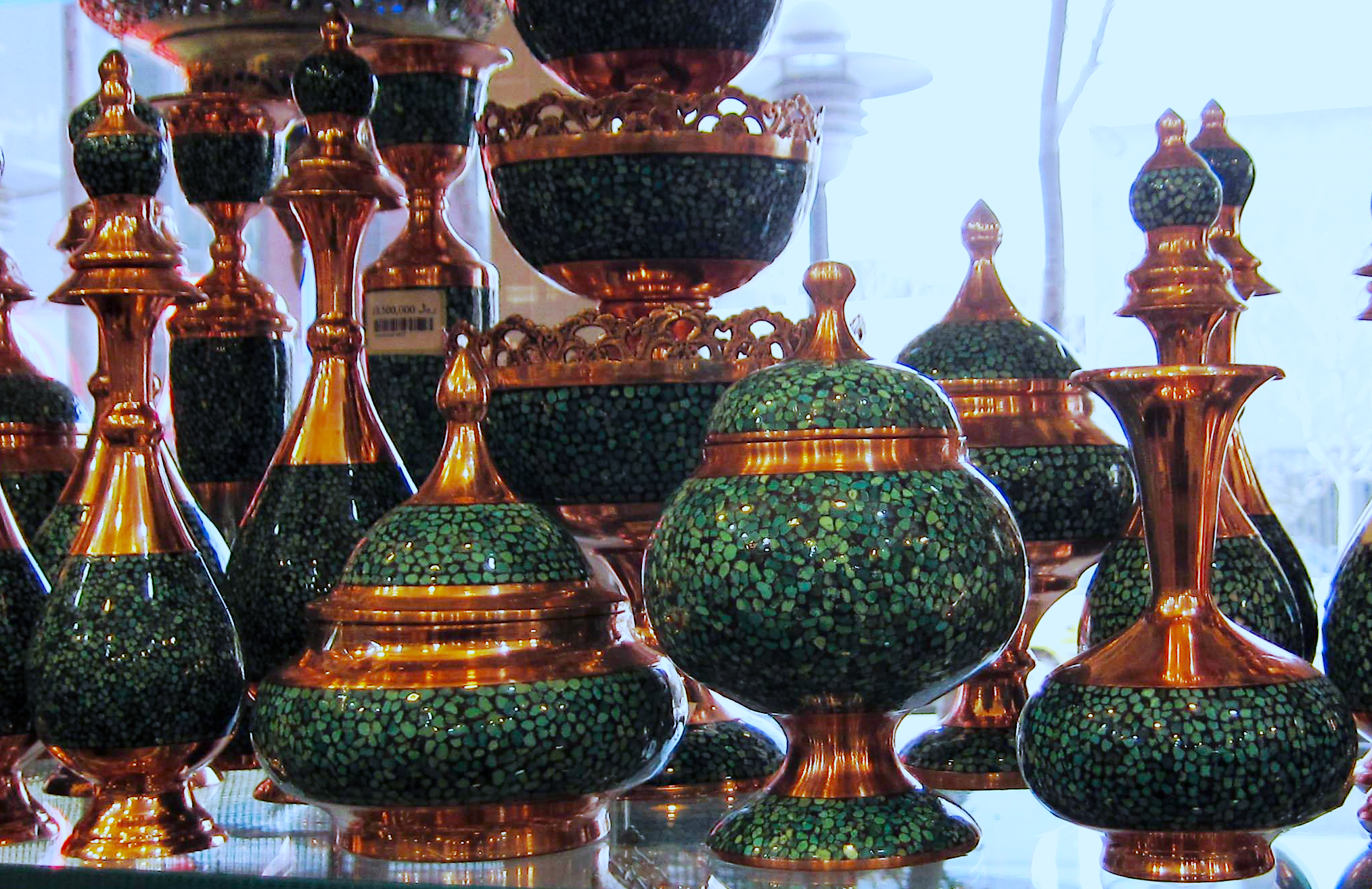
Examples of Firoozeh Koobi pieces in a store

Firoozeh Koobi (Persian: فیروزه کوبی; Firouze Koobi, or Firuzehkubi) is an Iranian handicraft made of a copper vessel that is covered with inlaid turquoise stone. It is one of the most popular souvenirs of Isfahan. Although the technique has a short history (less than 100 years), due to the use of precious stones and the design it is highly valued.

== History ==
Since the ancient times in Persia, turquoise has been a valued gemstone; the oldest turquoise mine in Iran is the Nishapur mine. Roughly in the 1950s, Yusef Hakimian founded this art in Mashhad. Today, Firoozeh Koobi is created primarily in Isfahan, and many artists and craftsmen have set up turquoise workshops in this city.

Firoozeh Koobi is a product made of copper, brass, silver, or bronze, in which small pieces of turquoise stone are placed together on a part of its surface in a mosaic form. Turquoise inlaying is recognized in Iran as an art-industry in the division and classification of Iranian handicrafts, which has an artistic and aesthetic aspect and has a decorative application. Turquoise Inlaying is commonly used for decorating items such as jewelry, vases, candlesticks, and mirror frames.

== See also ==
- Iranian handicrafts
