= Sistan embroidery =

Iranian needlework style

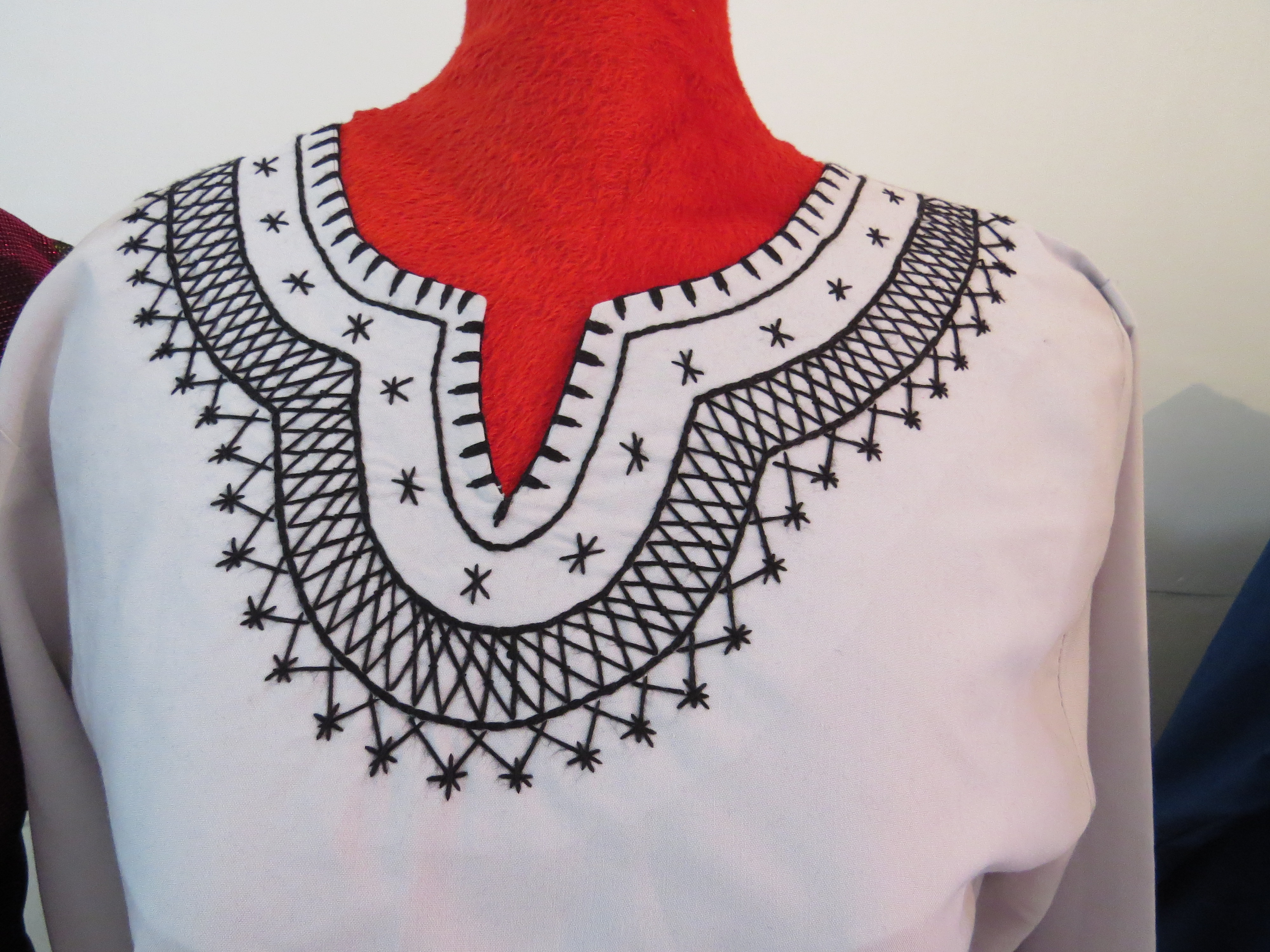
Example of Sistan embroidery, traditional black

Sistan embroidery is a type of needlework often used to decorate clothing along the chest and the cuffs, from the Sistan and Baluchestan Province of Iran. Additionally this needlework can be found on tablecloths, rugs, cushions, bedspreads, and wedding tables.

== About ==
This is an ancient handicraft that has been traced as far back as 5th-century BC, from the Scythians. In the Sistan region clothing historically has been created using fabric in shades of white and cream for both genders, in order to reflect light; and traditionally on women's clothing the embroidery was black, and on men's clothing the embroidery was cream. The thread used was often silk, in order to form geometric and linear motifs.

Khameh is a related craft which is made using raw-colored fabric and white silk embroidery.

== See also ==
- Balochi needlework
- Iranian handicrafts
