= Gombroon ware =

Iranian pottery resembling porcelain

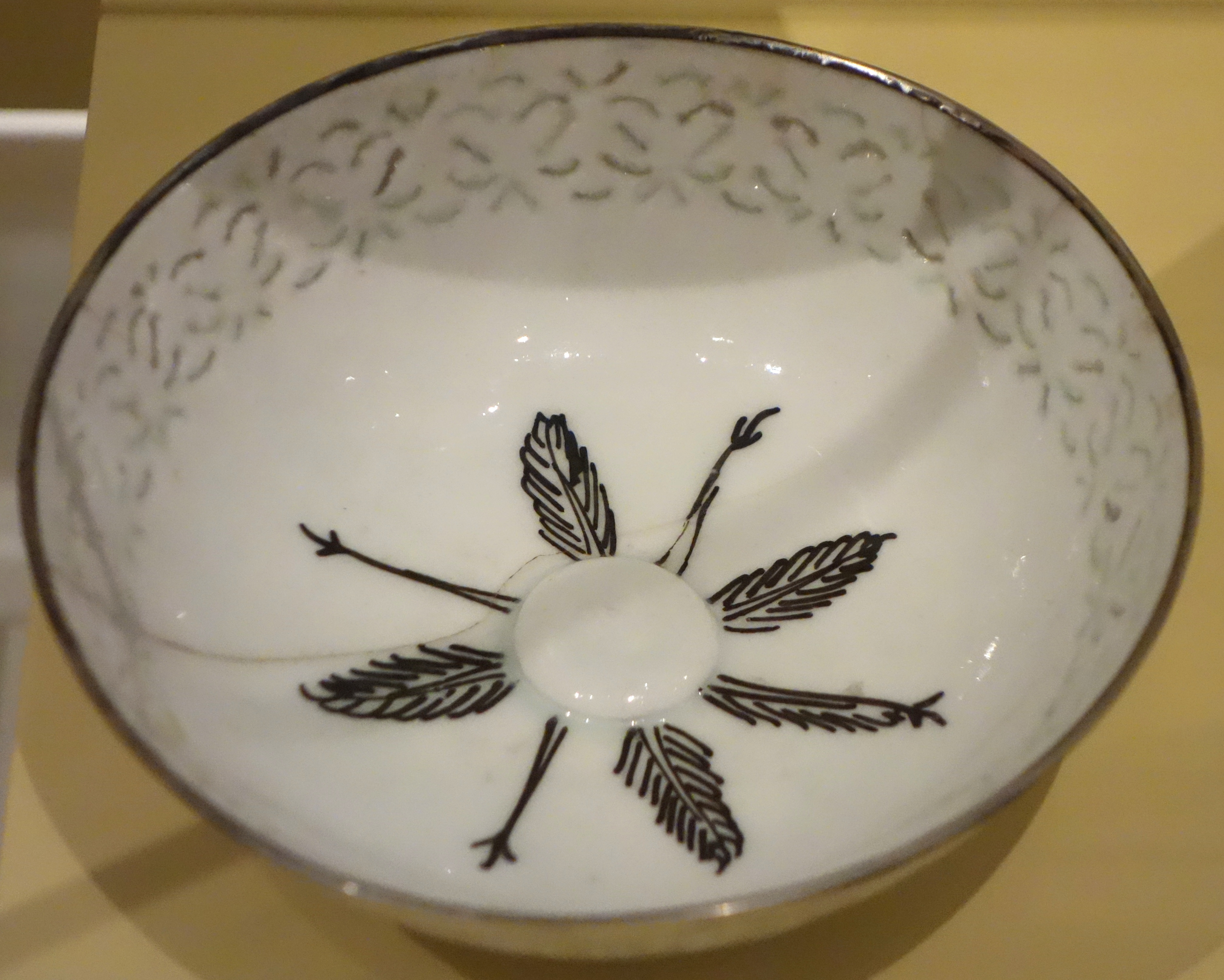
Gombroon ware bowl, Iran, 18th century

Gombroon ware is a form of white pottery resembling porcelain, pierced with holes or slits, and perhaps sparsely decorated with simple black or blue lines, which was created in the late 17th and early 18th century Gombroon (now Bandar Abbas), Iran. It was made from crushed quartz, white clay, and frit, which when fired becomes glassy. Early mentions of Gombroon ware occur in John Fryer's New Account of East-India and Persia (1672-1681), Martin Lister's Journey to Paris (1699), and Horace Walpole's description of his Strawberry Hill collection.
