= Dilmaghani =

Coordinates: 41°0′12.5″N 73°48′45.3″W

Mehdi Dilmaghani & Co. Inc
- Company type: Private
- Industry: Import
- Founded: 1922
- Founder: Mehdi Dilmaghani
- Headquarters: New York, USA
- Products: Carpets Textiles Manufacture
- Website: http://www.dilmaghani.com

The Dilmaghani family, the oldest existing manufacturers of hand knotted carpets and oriental rugs, can be traced back to the 1850s Qajar dynasty, Persia. In an industry which largely produces untitled items often identifiable only by experts, the history and lineage of any name relating to specific types of rugs for so many decades is unusual. Through the 1960s, the Dilmaghani family was still designing, manufacturing and importing Persian carpets from Iran to the United States. Dilmaghani is seen as an important connection of 19th and 20th century Persian rug and carpet production in and around the cities of Tabriz and Kermān. Dilmaghani remained as of 1980 among the best known names of branded hand knotted carpets.

== Identification ==
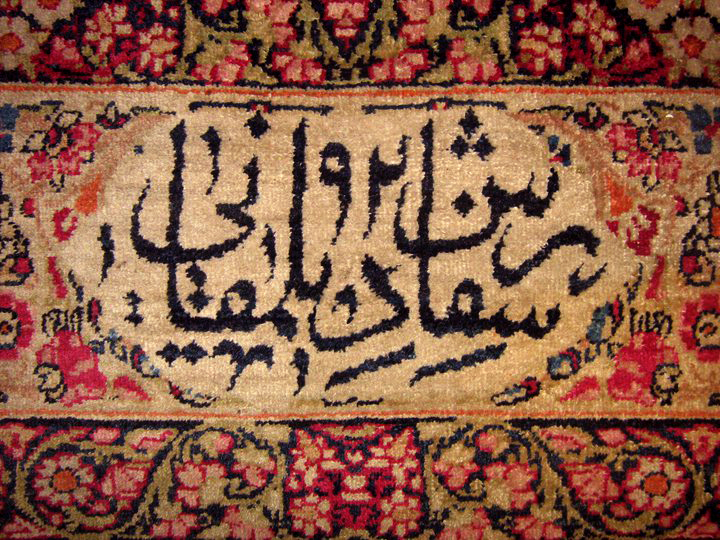
Antique '92' Dilmaghani Kerman Signature ca. 1880

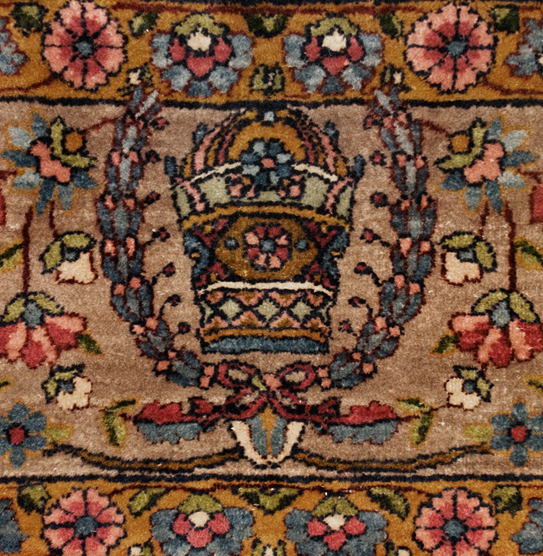
Semi Antique Dilmaghani Kerman "Cyrus Crown" ca. 1925

Often, carpets by Dilmaghani from the mid 19th century through the early first quarter of the 20th are identifiable by a large woven signature (in Persian). They are usually within the border of Kermān Persian rugs bearing cartouche inscriptions loosely translate as: "Made to Order by Dilmaghani."

Post first quarter 20th century examples are either modestly signed, or bear the firm's trademark Crown with laurel, known as the Cyrus Crown. Mid-century unauthorized replicas of the firm's Crown Kerman carpets are often referred to as "Imperial Crown" or "Crown Royal" Kermans. These and other permutations using the word "Crown" were created by other manufacturers to ride on the clout of true Cyrus Crown Carpets as well as the Dilmaghani firm.

== History ==
The Dilmaghani family were of Azerbaijani origin, and were largely wholesale general merchants, or tujjar (Khan al-Tujjar), as well as sarraf, or bankers. The first account of the Dilmaghani family that relates to carpet manufacturing and trade traces from the 1850s; first in Tabriz and later in Kermān. The Dilmaghanis were also involved in the export of dried fruit to Russia and Turkey working through agents throughout Persia and representatives in Constantinople.

The oldest documented and verifiable producer of Dilmaghani branded carpets is Hadji Mohammed Hussein Dilmaghani, whose primary business were selling bills of credit to India and manufacturing fine Persian carpets.

Mehdi Dilmaghani, Hadji Mohammad's son, arrived in the United States in 1922 and founded Mehdi Dilmaghani & Co. Inc. in Manhattan New York. Mehdi Dilmaghani continued to manufacture, import and distribute Persian rugs for the American and European markets and therefore is regarded as a significant tie between 19th and 20th century carpet production.

In 1963, Mehdi Dilmaghani and Co. Inc relocated from Manhattan to Scarsdale, New York. The Dilmaghani firm contracted architect Robert Carroll May, a long-time understudy & apprentice of Frank Lloyd Wright to carry out Dilmaghani's building design.

Today, 4th and 5th generation Dilmaghanis continue, and are active, in the Oriental Rug industry. Dennis Dilmaghani, Mehdi Dilmaghani's son, became president and took over operation of the company in 1977. David Dilmaghani (5th generation) operates his own business with focus on antique and vintage hand knotted rugs in retail capacity both online (national and international) and locally with a retail presence.

== Persian rugs ==
Dilmaghani Persian rug production into the 1880s was supervised by Hadji Mohammed Hussein's brother, Hadji Mohammad Dilmaghani. In 1911, more than 2,000 weavers in Kerman City were under contract to Hadji Mohammad Dilmaghani. Their primary market was in America, and by 1917 the market value of a single export shipment to Europe or America could reach as high as $24,000.

From the early 1920s through the early 1960s, Dilmaghani owned three factories in Kerman, and several in Tabriz and Sarouk, Persia. Based on quality, these carpets were subjected to the highest import tax assessment determined by United States Customs. In 1929, Dilmaghani adapted a crown and laurel woven into specific rugs to supplement or substitute the long-time run of Dilmaghani signatures. Mehdi Dilmaghani & Co. Inc. registered several variations of their Cyrus Crown trademark in 1934. Post mid 20th century, Dilmaghani still traded and imported Kerman carpets, and the Cyrus Crown trademark remains active and in use today. Over the course of nearly sixty years, Mehdi manufactured an estimated 25,000 Crown Kerman, Crown Sarouks and Crown Tabriz Carpets ranging from 2'x3' to 15' x 30' in size. Crown carpets were extensively documented, and the firm still retains many original production records including weaver names and loom dates for carpets from the 1930s.

== Oriental rugs ==
Since the early 1950s, Dilmaghani manufactured and imported oriental rugs from many countries other than Iran including carpets made in Afghanistan, Armenia, Bulgaria, China, Hungary, India, Japan, Nepal, Pakistan, Portugal, Romania, Russia, Spain, Tibet and Turkey.

An installation of a Dilmaghani carpet was made in the Reading Room of the Clinton School of Public Service located on the William J. Clinton Presidential Center Campus, Little Rock Arkansas 2004 which took several years to make.

== Notable products ==
Cyrus Crown Carpets

This is the company's flagship brand

Adnan Collection

A Dilmaghani Cyrus Crown edition carpet.
