= Garrus ware =

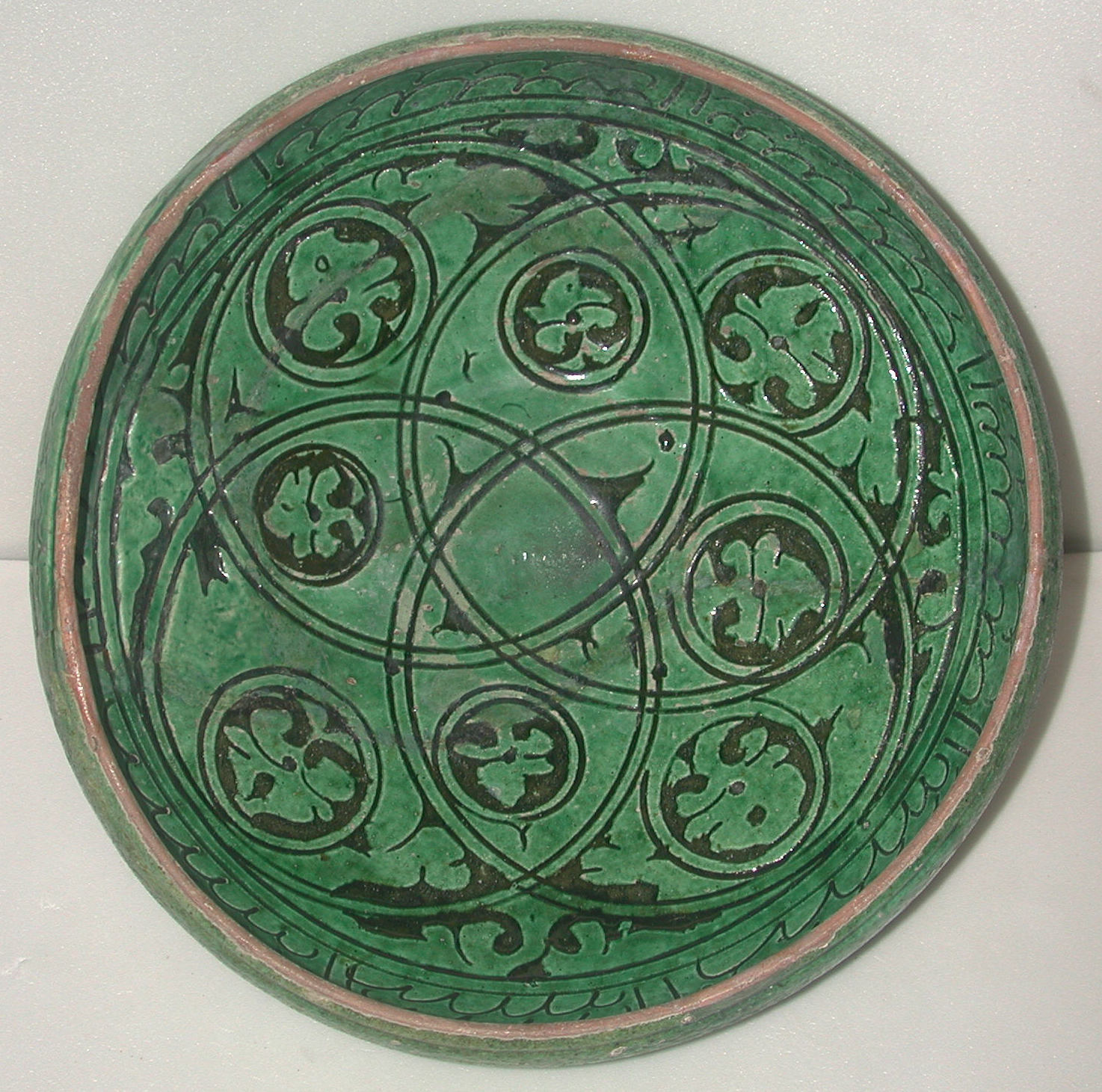
Example, 12-13th century

Garrus ware is a type of Iranian ceramics, named after a district southwest of the Caspian Sea, where examples were reportedly found.
