= Gabbeh =

Traditional variety of Persian carpet

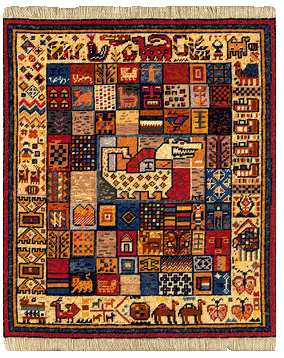
A gabbeh carpet

Gabbeh or gabba (Persian: گبه) carpets are a traditional variety of Persian carpet. Gabbeh is known as gava in Kurdish and Luri and is also called khersak (خرسک) in Bakhtiari, literally meaning a "bear's cub". Traditionally a sleeping rug, a gabbeh is a hand-woven pile rug of coarse quality and medium size (90 x 150 cm, 3 by 5 ft, or larger) characterized by an abstract design that relies upon open fields of color and a playfulness with geometry. This type of rug is popular among the populations of the Zagros Mountains of Iran, including Kurdish, Luri and Qashqai people. The gabbeh is usually crafted by women.

Gabbeh carpets are much thicker and coarser than other Persian carpets; sometimes they can be as much as one inch or 2.5 cm in depth. In fact, they are more a variety of kilim than carpet. The word "gabbeh" comes from the Persian گبه, meaning raw, natural, uncut. This is a rough and primitive carpet.

Gabbeh patterns are of a very basic kind with only a limited number of decorative, mostly rectangular objects resembling mainly animals. In gabbeh usually bright colors, such as yellow and red, are used. Although large fields of solid color are used in gabbeh designs, the color is variegated (the color varies throughout the rug, with the appearance of differently colored zones).

Gabbehs are made of natural, handspun wool yarn and all the colors are created with natural plant dye. Due to its relative ease of production (less precise pattern, small number of knots per square centimeter, etc.) a gabbeh is one of the less expensive varieties of Persian carpet.

In the 1980s, after the Iranian artist Parviz Tanavoli had experimented with vegetally dyed gabbehs, Gholamreza Zollanvari began producing the rugs in larger quantities, employing Qashgayi and Luri weavers. Increased production by the Zollanvari family, including their introduction of new patterns, exerted considerable influence on European rug markets.
