= Kerman =

City in Kerman province, Iran

Kerman Persian: کرمان Kārmānia, Boutiā, Carmānia, Karmana
- City
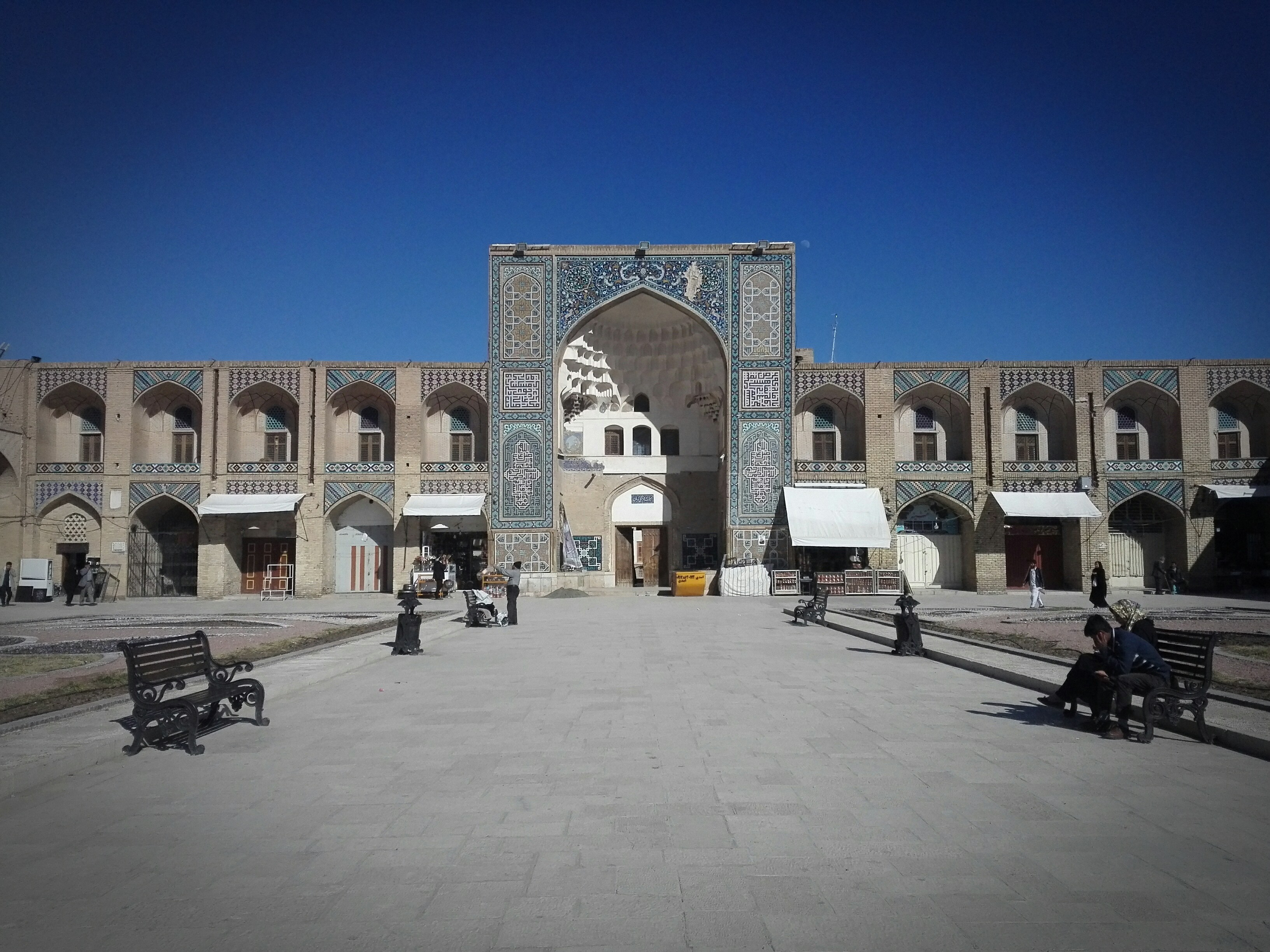
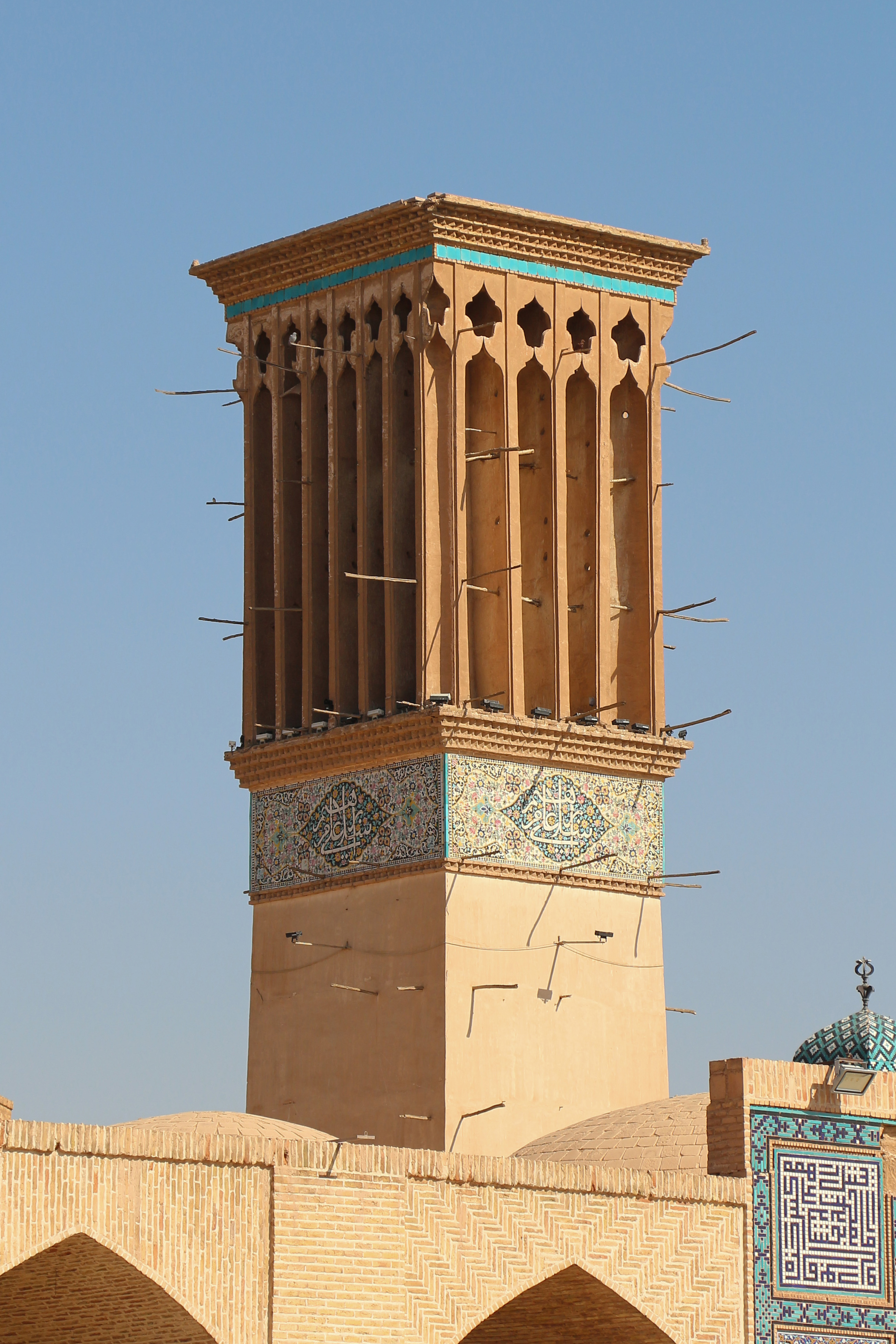
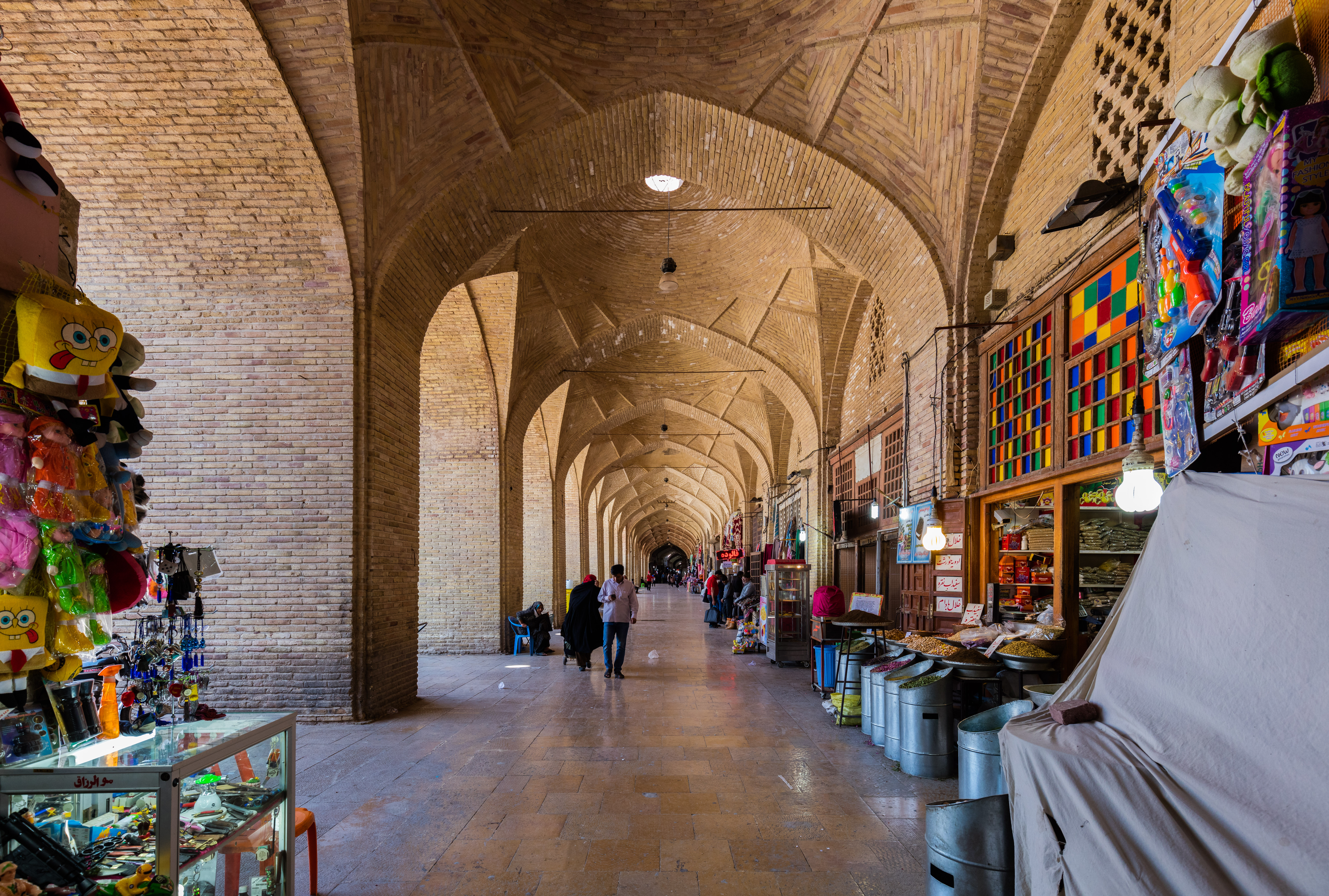
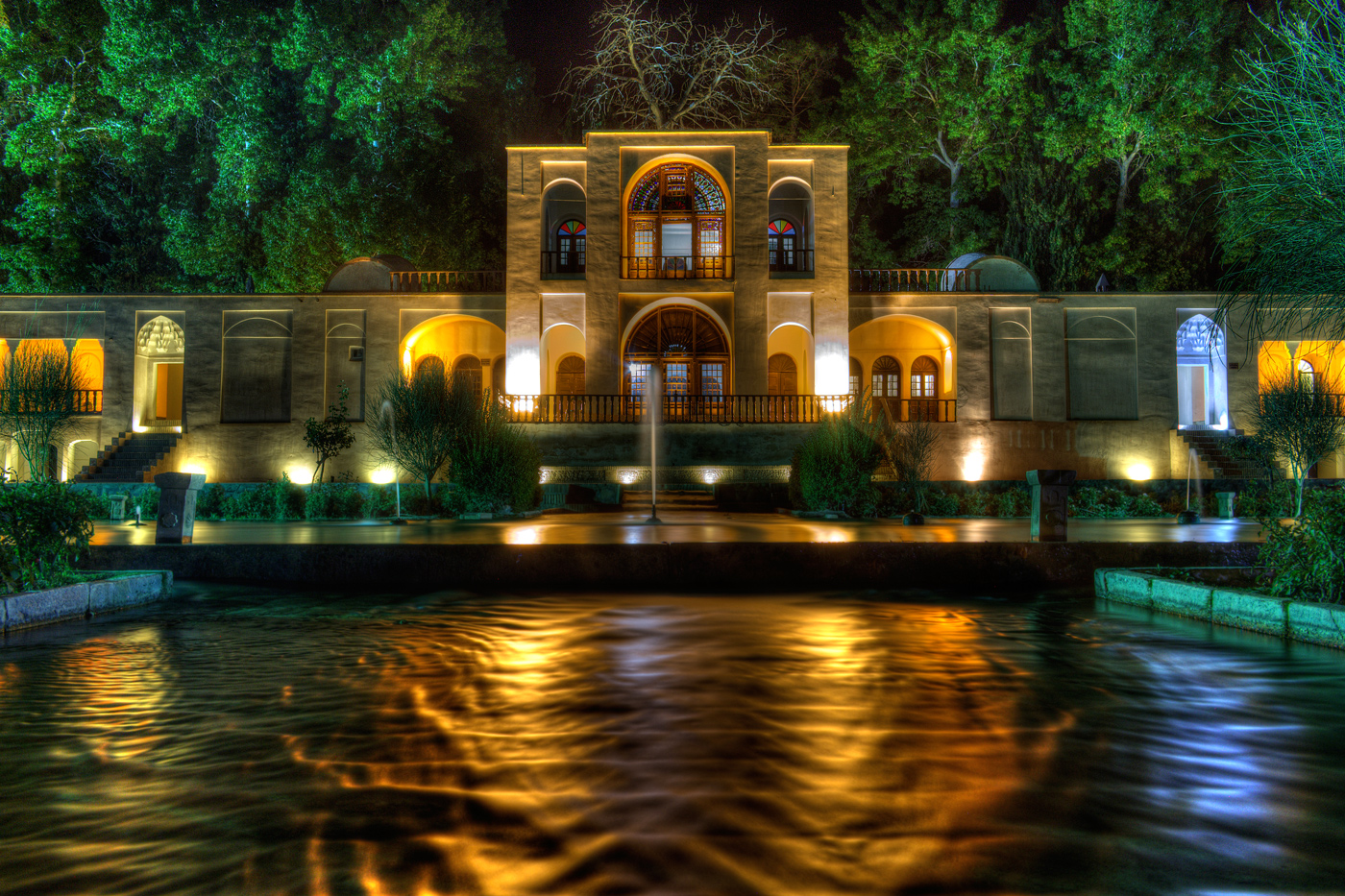
- Ganjali Khan Complex Kerman Grand Bazaar Windcatcher Kerman Grand Bazaar Shazdeh Garden

- Seal
- Nicknames: ديار كريمان (Persian for "Land of Karimans"), The City of Stars
- Location within Iran
- Coordinates: 30°15′45″N 57°03′27″E
- Country: Iran
- Province: Kerman
- County: Kerman
- District: Central
- Founded: c. 3rd century BC (Official:1907)

Government
  - Mayor: Mohsen Tuyserkani

Area
  - City: 240 km^{2} (93 sq mi)
- Elevation: 1,755 m (5,758 ft)

Population (2016)
  - City: 537,718
  - Density: 2,200/km^{2} (5,800/sq mi)
  - Urban: 738,374
  - Population rank in Iran: 14th
- Demonym: Kermani
- Time zone: UTC+3:30 (IRST)
- Postal code: 761
- Area code: +98 343
- Main language(s): Persian
- Climate: BWk
- Website: kermancity.ir

Kerman (Persian: كرمان; [kʲeɾˈmɒːn]) (Note: Also romanized as Kirman, Karmana, Kermân, and Kermun; known in ancient times as the satrapy of Carmania) is a city in the Central District of Kerman County, Kerman province, Iran, serving as capital of the province, the county, and the district.

== History ==
Kerman was founded as a defensive outpost, under the name Veh-Ardashir, by Ardashir I, founder of the Sasanian Empire, in the 3rd century AD.

After the Battle of Nahāvand in 642, the city came under Muslim rule. The Abbasid Caliphate's authority over the region was weak, and power passed in the tenth century to the Buyid emirs. The region and city fell to Mahmud of Ghazni in the late tenth century. The name Kerman was adopted at some point in the tenth century.

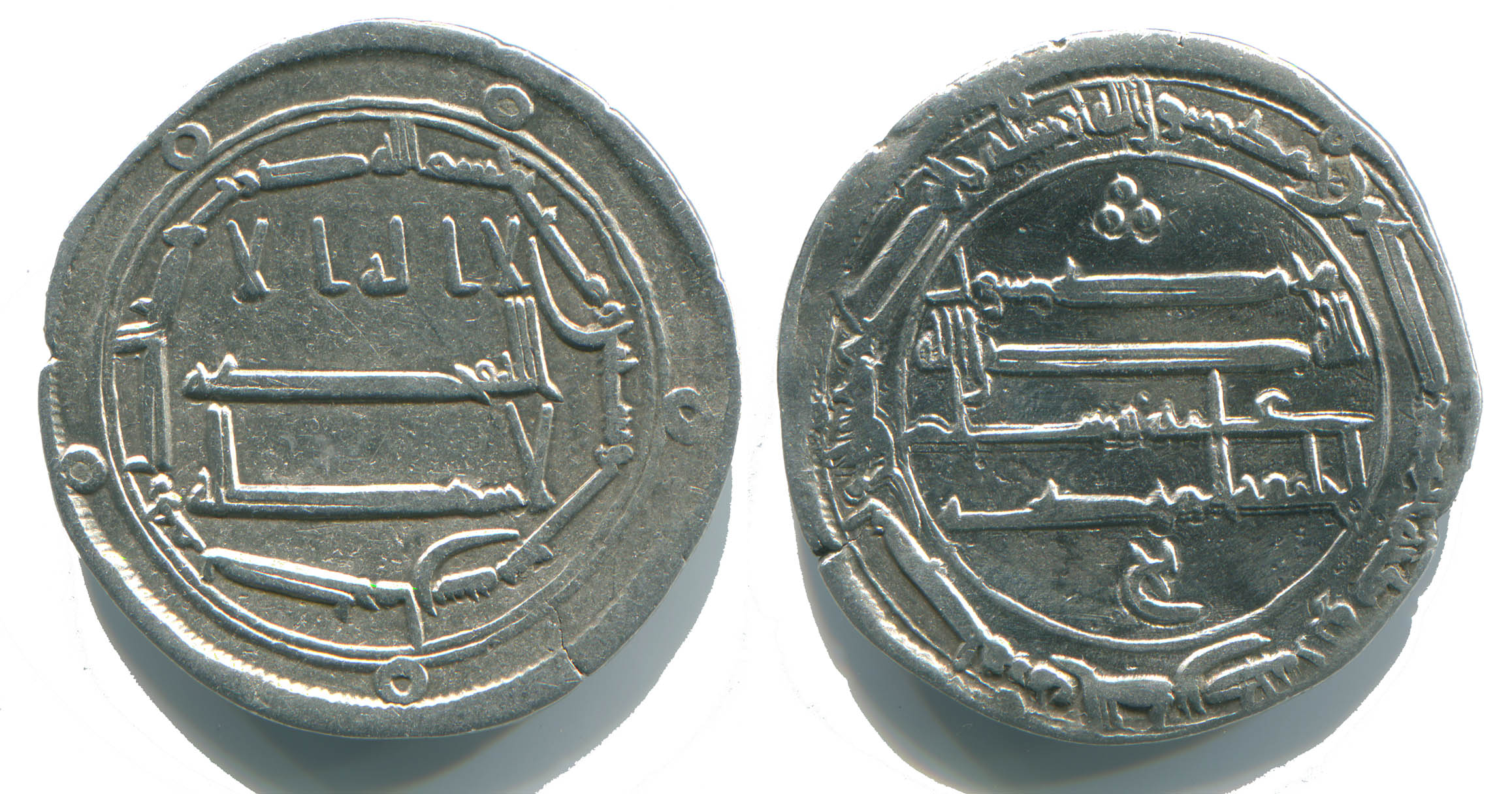
Dirham of Abbasid caliph al-Mahdi ibn al-Mansur, 8th century. Silver 2.95 g

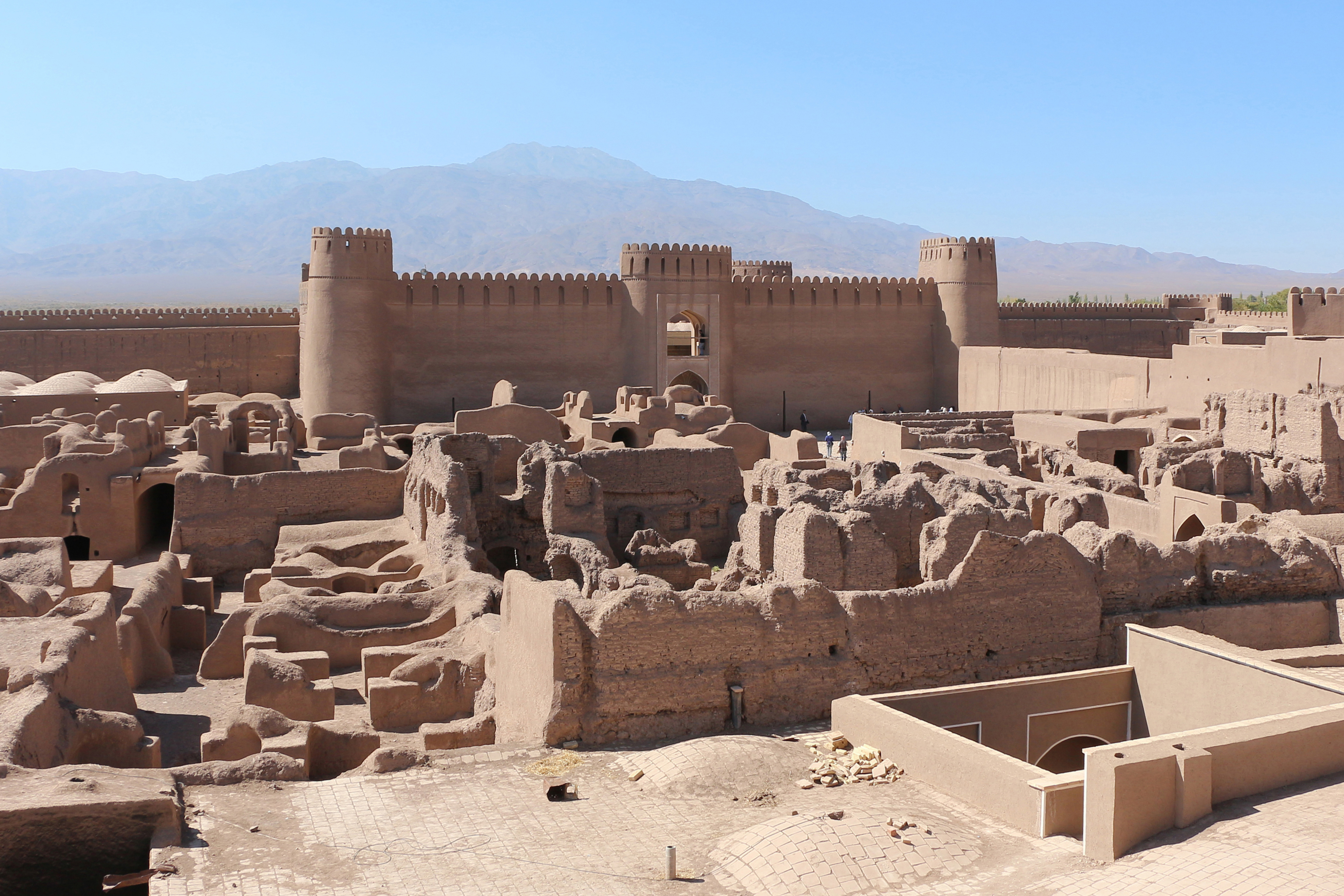
The Rayen Castle, the second largest brick building in the world

Under Seljuk Turkish rule in the 11th and 12th centuries, Kerman remained virtually independent, conquering Oman and Fars. When Marco Polo visited Kerman in 1271, it had become a major trade emporium linking the Persian Gulf with Khorasan and Central Asia. Subsequently, however, the city was sacked many times by various invaders. Kerman expanded rapidly during the Safavid dynasty. Carpets and rugs were exported to England and Germany during this period. In 1793 Lotf Ali Khan defeated the Qajars, and in 1794 he captured Kerman. But soon after he was besieged in Kerman for six months by Agha Mohammad Khan Qajar. When the city fell to Agha Mohammad Khan, angered by the popular support that Lotf Ali Khan had received, many of the male inhabitants were killed or blinded, and a pile was made out of 20,000 detached eyeballs and piled in front of the victorious Agha Mohammad Khan.

== Demographics ==
=== Ethnicity and religion ===
The people of Kerman are Persians, and are mostly Muslim, with a small Zoroastrian minority.

=== Population ===
The population of the city in 1996 was 385,000. At the time of the 2006 national census, the city's population was 496,684 in 127,806 households. The following census in 2011 counted 534,441 people in 147,922 households. The 2016 census measured the population of the city at 537,718 people in 162,677 households.

It is the largest and most developed city in the province and one of the most important cities in southeastern Iran. It is also one of the largest cities in Iran in terms of area. Kerman is famous for its long history and strong cultural heritage. The city is home to many historic mosques and Zoroastrian fire temples. Kerman has been the capital city of Iranian dynasties several times during its history. It is located on a large, flat plain, 800 km (500 mi) south-east of Tehran, the capital of Iran.

=== Population development ===
Some of these figures are estimates only, official census results are indicated with (¹).

Year	Population
1896 ¹	40,228
1906	55,000
1916 ¹	52,154
1926 ¹	55,048
1936	75,000
1946 ¹	97,363
1956 ¹	101,716
1966 ¹	140,761
1976 ¹	254,786
1986	310,000
1991	350,000
1996 ¹	384,991

Year	Population
2001	450,000
2006 ¹	515,414
2011 ¹	734,442

¹ official census results

== Geography ==
=== Surrounding municipalities ===
Kerman is surrounded by the following cities: Anar to the northwest; Ravar to the north; Shahdad to the northeast; Rafsanjan to the west; Jiroft to the south; Sirjan to the southwest; Mahan to the southeast; and Bam to the east.

=== Location ===
Kerman is located on a high margin of the Lut Desert (Kavir-e Lut) in the south-central part of Iran. The city is surrounded by mountains. Kerman is also located along the mountain Saheb al-Zaman.

The city is 1,755 m (5,758 ft) above sea level, making it third in elevation among provincial capitals in Iran. Winter brings very cold nights to Kerman. The mountains in the south and southeast are snow-capped all year round.

Kerman is located at latitude 30.29 and longitude 57.06.

=== Climate ===
Kerman has a cold desert climate (BWk, according to the Köppen climate classification), with hot summers and cool to cold winters. Precipitation is scarce throughout the year.

The city's many districts are surrounded by mountains. The northern part of the city is located in an arid desert area, while the highland of the southern part of the city enjoys a more moderate climate.

The city of Kerman has a moderate climate. The average annual rainfall is 148 mm. Otherwise, its climate is relatively cool (by Iranian standards).

Climate data for Kerman – Altitude: 1753.8 m (1991–2020, records 1951–2020) (Note: Rainy days calculated using parameters 46, 69 and 71 from the NOAA source)
Month	Jan	Feb	Mar	Apr	May	Jun	Jul	Aug	Sep	Oct	Nov	Dec	Year
Record high °C (°F)	24.4 (75.9)	29.4 (84.9)	32.9 (91.2)	35.0 (95.0)	38.8 (101.8)	41.6 (106.9)	42.0 (107.6)	42.3 (108.1)	39.0 (102.2)	35.0 (95.0)	31.1 (88.0)	28.0 (82.4)	42.3 (108.1)
Mean daily maximum °C (°F)	13.2 (55.8)	15.6 (60.1)	19.7 (67.5)	25.2 (77.4)	30.8 (87.4)	35.4 (95.7)	36.4 (97.5)	34.8 (94.6)	32.1 (89.8)	26.7 (80.1)	19.9 (67.8)	15.5 (59.9)	25.4 (77.7)
Daily mean °C (°F)	5.1 (41.2)	7.9 (46.2)	12.0 (53.6)	17.5 (63.5)	22.7 (72.9)	27.5 (81.5)	28.7 (83.7)	26.4 (79.5)	22.9 (73.2)	17.3 (63.1)	10.6 (51.1)	6.4 (43.5)	17.1 (62.8)
Mean daily minimum °C (°F)	−2.6 (27.3)	−0.3 (31.5)	4.0 (39.2)	8.8 (47.8)	12.9 (55.2)	16.9 (62.4)	18.5 (65.3)	15.3 (59.5)	11.4 (52.5)	6.9 (44.4)	1.4 (34.5)	−2.1 (28.2)	7.6 (45.7)
Record low °C (°F)	−30.0 (−22.0)	−20.0 (−4.0)	−10.2 (13.6)	−3.0 (26.6)	1.0 (33.8)	7.0 (44.6)	8.0 (46.4)	2.0 (35.6)	−1.0 (30.2)	−10.0 (14.0)	−15.0 (5.0)	−25.0 (−13.0)	−30.0 (−22.0)
Average precipitation mm (inches)	21.6 (0.85)	27.2 (1.07)	26.3 (1.04)	17.6 (0.69)	7.9 (0.31)	0.5 (0.02)	0.4 (0.02)	0.9 (0.04)	0.4 (0.02)	2.9 (0.11)	6.1 (0.24)	18.3 (0.72)	130.1 (5.12)
Average snowfall cm (inches)	3.7 (1.5)	1.0 (0.4)	0.1 (0.0)	0.0 (0.0)	0.0 (0.0)	0.0 (0.0)	0.0 (0.0)	0.0 (0.0)	0.0 (0.0)	0.0 (0.0)	0.0 (0.0)	2.6 (1.0)	7.4 (2.9)
Average precipitation days (≥ 1.0 mm)	4.2	4.0	4.7	3.2	1.5	0.1	0.2	0.2	0.1	0.6	1.4	3	23.2
Average rainy days	4.7	5.3	6.7	4.5	1.9	0.4	0.3	0.4	0.1	0.9	2.6	3.6	31.4
Average snowy days	2.2	1.0	0.4	0	0	0	0	0	0	0	0.1	1.0	4.7
Average relative humidity (%)	50	45	38	33	24	17	17	18	19	27	38	45	30.9
Average dew point °C (°F)	−10.3 (13.5)	−9.4 (15.1)	−8.5 (16.7)	−6.1 (21.0)	−5.7 (21.7)	−6.1 (21.0)	−5.1 (22.8)	−6.1 (21.0)	−7.6 (18.3)	−7.8 (18.0)	−9.1 (15.6)	−10.4 (13.3)	−7.7 (18.2)
Mean monthly sunshine hours	215	208	240	257	306	332	350	354	318	297	245	226	3,348
Source 1: NOAA
Source 2: IRIMO (records), (snowfall and snow days 1981-2010)

=== Geological characteristics ===
For Iranian paleontologists, Kerman has always been considered a fossil paradise. The discovery of new dinosaur footprints in 2005 renewed hopes for a better understanding the history of this area.

== Economy ==
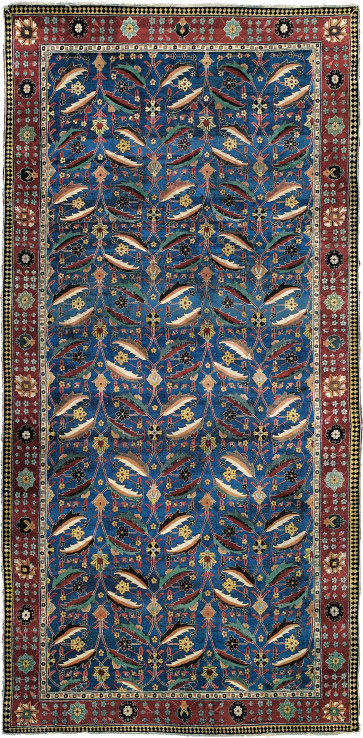
A Kerman carpet

Carpet weaving is one of the main industries of the city, and the carpets produced there are renowned internationally. Carpet weaving is a very old tradition in Kerman. The oldest carpet discovered in Kerman, dates from about 500 years ago. Cotton textiles and goatwool shawls are also manufactured.

A number of modern establishments such as textile mills and brickworks also have been constructed. The province's mineral wealth includes copper and coal.

== Culture ==
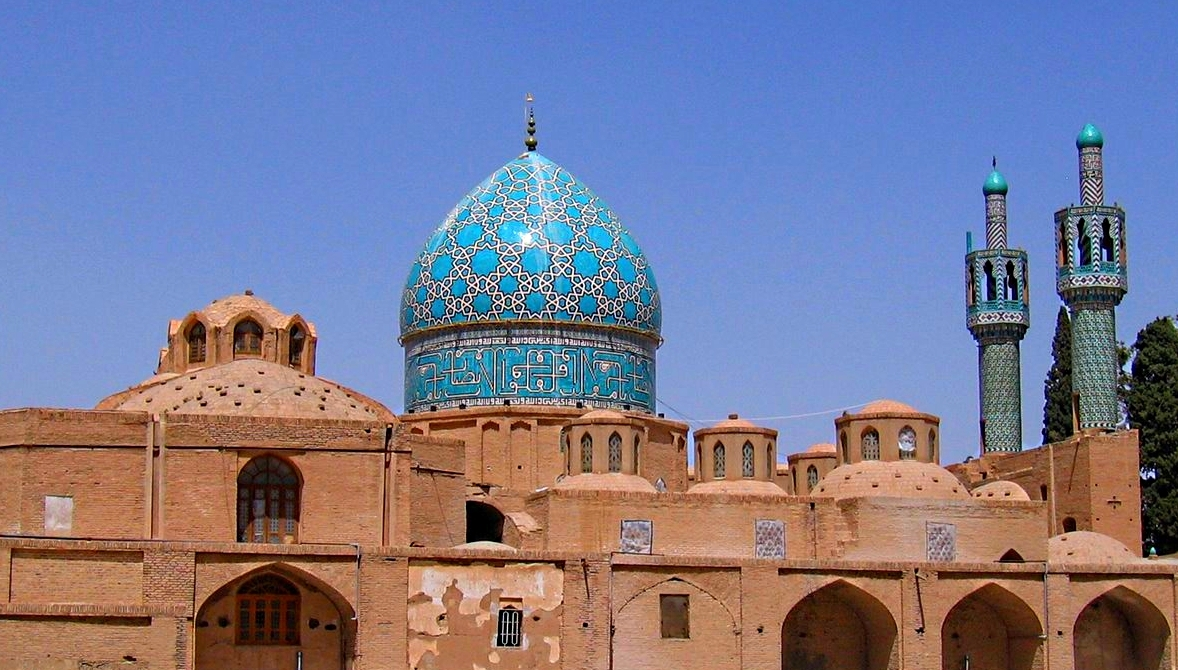
Tiled dome of the Shrine of Shah Nematollah Vali, in Mahan, 20 mi (32 km) outside of Kerman

The only Iranian anthropology museum dedicated to Zoroastrianism is located in the Kerman Fire Temple, showcasing the ancient history of Zoroastrians. The idea of launching the museum along with the library of Kerman's Zoroastrian Society came to light in 1983, when the head of the society, Parviz Vakhashouri, and the former head of the library, Mehran Gheibi, collected cultural heritage artifacts of Kerman's Zoroastrian community. These two officials added many other objects to this collection. The museum was officially inaugurated during Jashn-e Tirgan in 2005 by Iran's Cultural Heritage, Handicrafts and Tourism Organization (ICHHTO).

Jashn-e Tirgan or Tiregan is an ancient Iranian rain festival observed on July 1. The festivity refers to archangel Tir (literally meaning arrow) or Tishtar (lightning), who appear in the sky to generate thunder and lightning for providing much-needed rain.

The Sadeh ceremony is celebrated every year in Kerman.

Also, the archeological ancient areas of Jiroft and Tappe Yahya Baft are located south of Kerman. Rayen Castle is also located in Rayen town, southeast of Kerman.

Some of the handicrafts and souvenirs of the province of Kerman are traditional embroidery known as pateh, carpets, rugs, jajeems, kilims (a coarse carpet), satchels, and other hand woven articles. Caraway seeds and pistachios from Rafsanjan, Zarand, and Kerman are best of the main items of this province.

== Sport ==
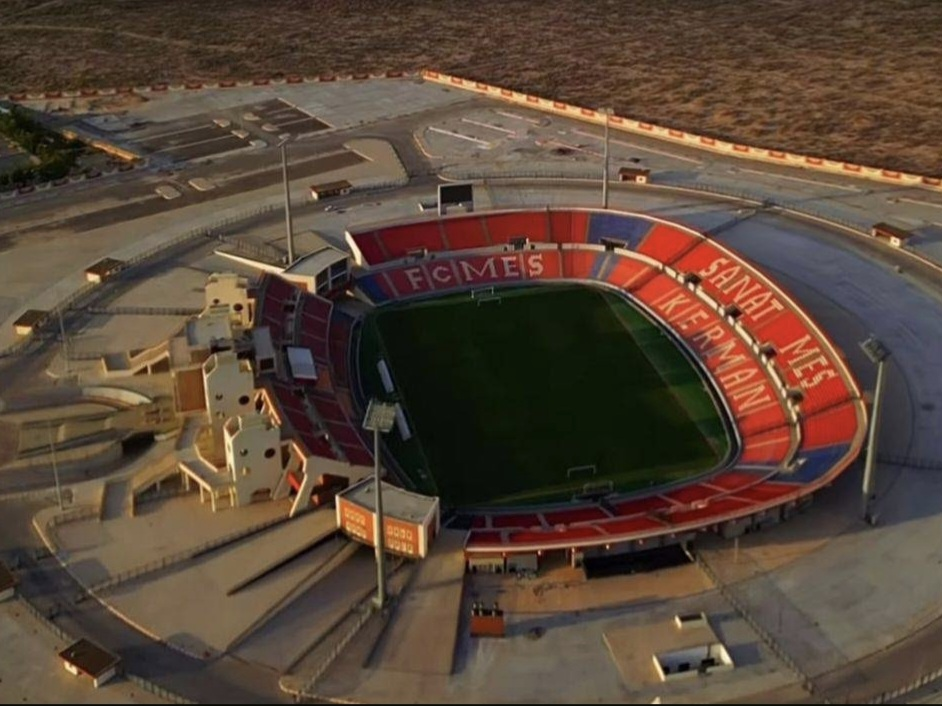
Mes Arena

Mes Kerman is the major football team of the city.

The Shahid Bahonar Stadium has 15,000 seats.

== Transportation ==
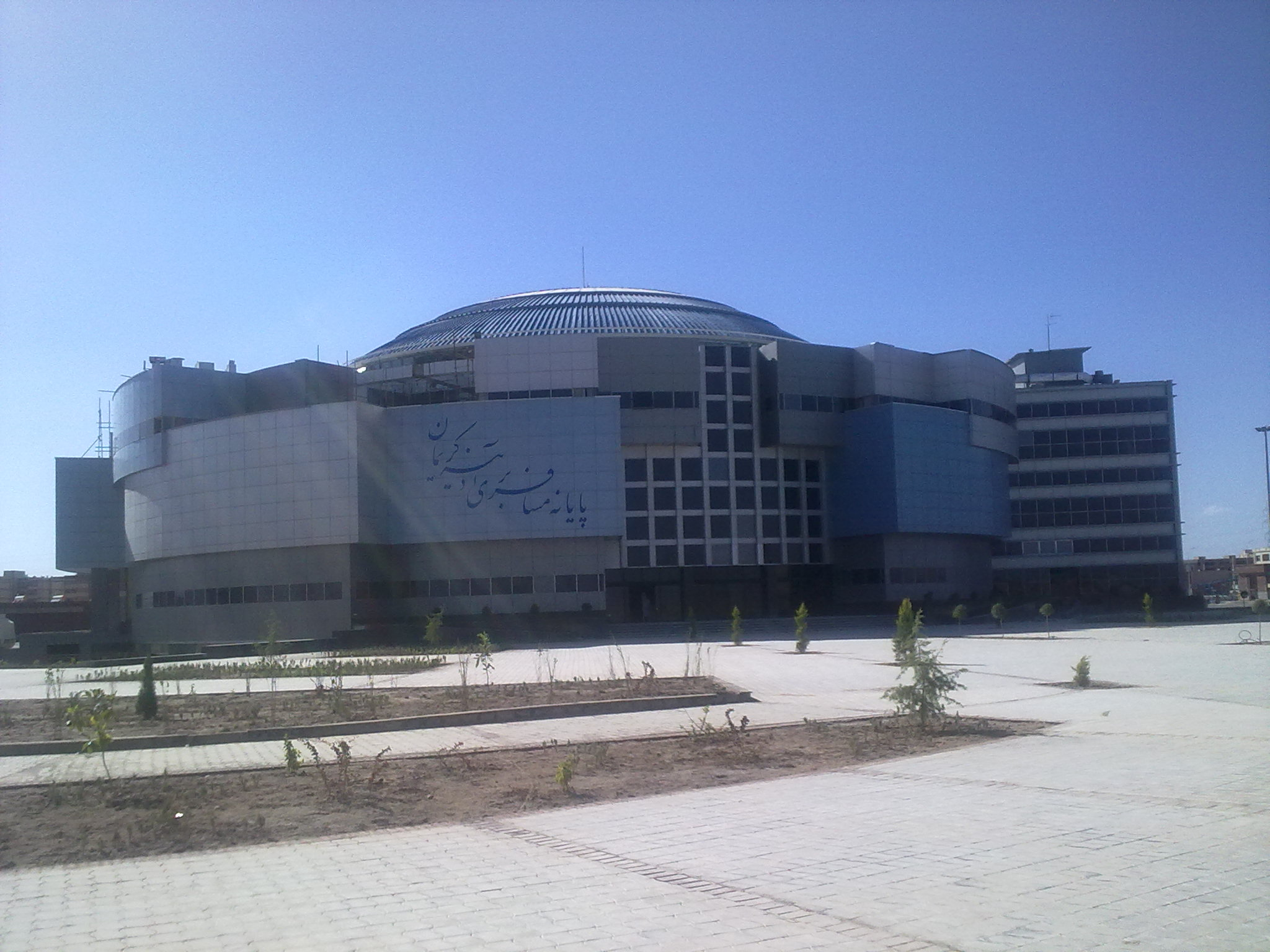
Kerman's Adineh bus terminus

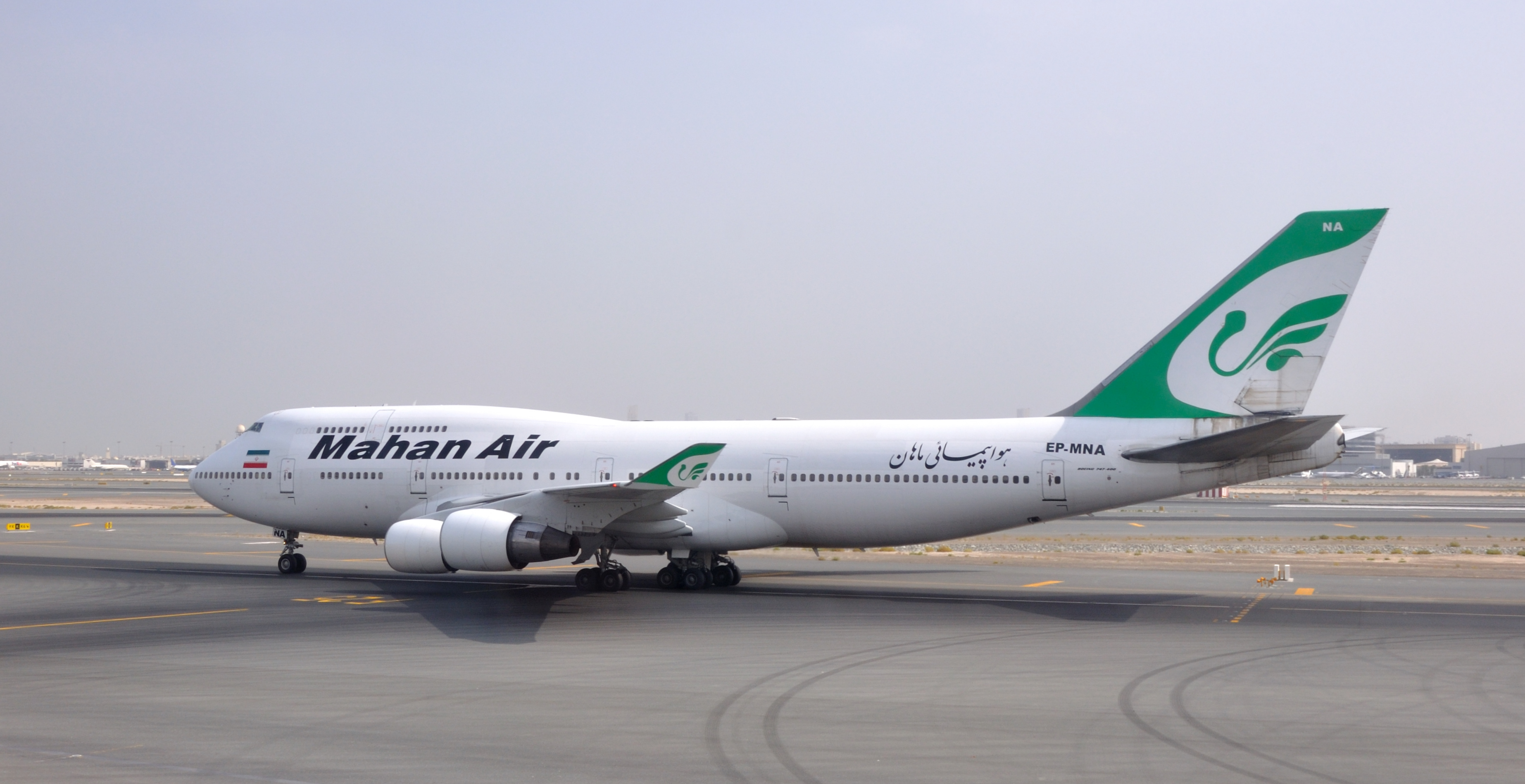
Boeing 747-400 of Iranian airline, Mahan Air

Kerman is on the Tehran, Bandar Abbas and Zahedan route. Ayatollah Hashemi Rafsanjani Airport is considered one of Iran's main airports. It has daily and weekly flights to Tehran, Ahwaz, Yazd, Esfahan, Bandar Abbas, Mashhad and Shiraz. Also, the Trans-Iranian Railway passes through this city. Kerman's newly built bus terminus, Adineh, opened in May 2013.

=== Chabahar–Zahedan Railway ===
In May 2016, during Indian Prime Minister Narendra Modi's trip to Iran, agreement was signed to develop two berths at Port of Chabahar and to build new Chabahar–Zahedan railway, as part of North–South Transport Corridor, by Indian Railways' public sector unit Ircon International.

== Colleges and universities ==
- Kerman Azad University
- Shahid Bahonar University of Kerman is one of technological institutions of Kerman province
- Kerman University of Medical Sciences is the a medical university
- Kerman Graduate University of Technology is a graduate-level degree-granting institution.
- Shahid Chamran Technical College of Kerman
- Payam Noor University of Kerman
- Kerman Khaje-Nasir Higher Education Center

== Notable people ==
- Al-Mahani (9th century mathematician and astronomer)
- Khwaju Kermani (14th century poet from the 14th century)
- Shah Nimatullah Wali (14th century Sufi Master and poet)
- Ganj Ali Khan (16th century Kurdish governor of Kerman)
- Mirza Reza Kermani (Iranian revolutionary who assassinated the Shah of Persia)
- Mohammad Javad Bahonar (the Prime minister of Iran from 15 to 30 August 1981 when he was assassinated by Mujahideen-e Khalq)
- Mohammad-Reza Bahonar (the conservative First Deputy Speaker of the Parliament of Iran)
- Mohammad Mehdi Zahedi (the former Iranian minister of Science and Technology and Mathematics full professor)
- Majid Namjoo (Iranian politician who was the Minister of Energy in the 9th government)
- Mohammad Ebrahim Bastani Parizi, historian, translator, and writer
- Houshang Moradi Kermani (writer)
- Keikhosrow Shahrokh
- Peyman Soltani, conductor of Melal Orchestra
- Saeed Nafisi (writer)
- Arash Borhani (soccer player)
- Zahra Nemati (Paralympic archery gold medalist at the 2012 Summer Paralympics, 2016 Summer Paralympics, 2020 Summer Paralympics)
- Roohollah Khaleghi
- Ali Movahedi-Kermani
- Mahnaz Afkhami (born 1941), Iranian-American politician and human rights and women's rights activist, served in the Cabinet of Iran (1976–78)
- Ahmad Madani (Iranian politician, Commander of Iranian Navy (1979))
- Javad Nurbakhsh, previous Master of the Nimatullahi Sufi Order
- Ahmadreza Ahmadi, poet and screenwriter
- Mozzafar Baghai, political figure
- Ali Akbar Abdolrashidi
- Parviz Shahriari (mathematician, author, translator and political activist)
- Tahereh Saffarzadeh, poet and writer

== Twin towns – sister cities ==
- Armavir, Armenia

== Gallery ==
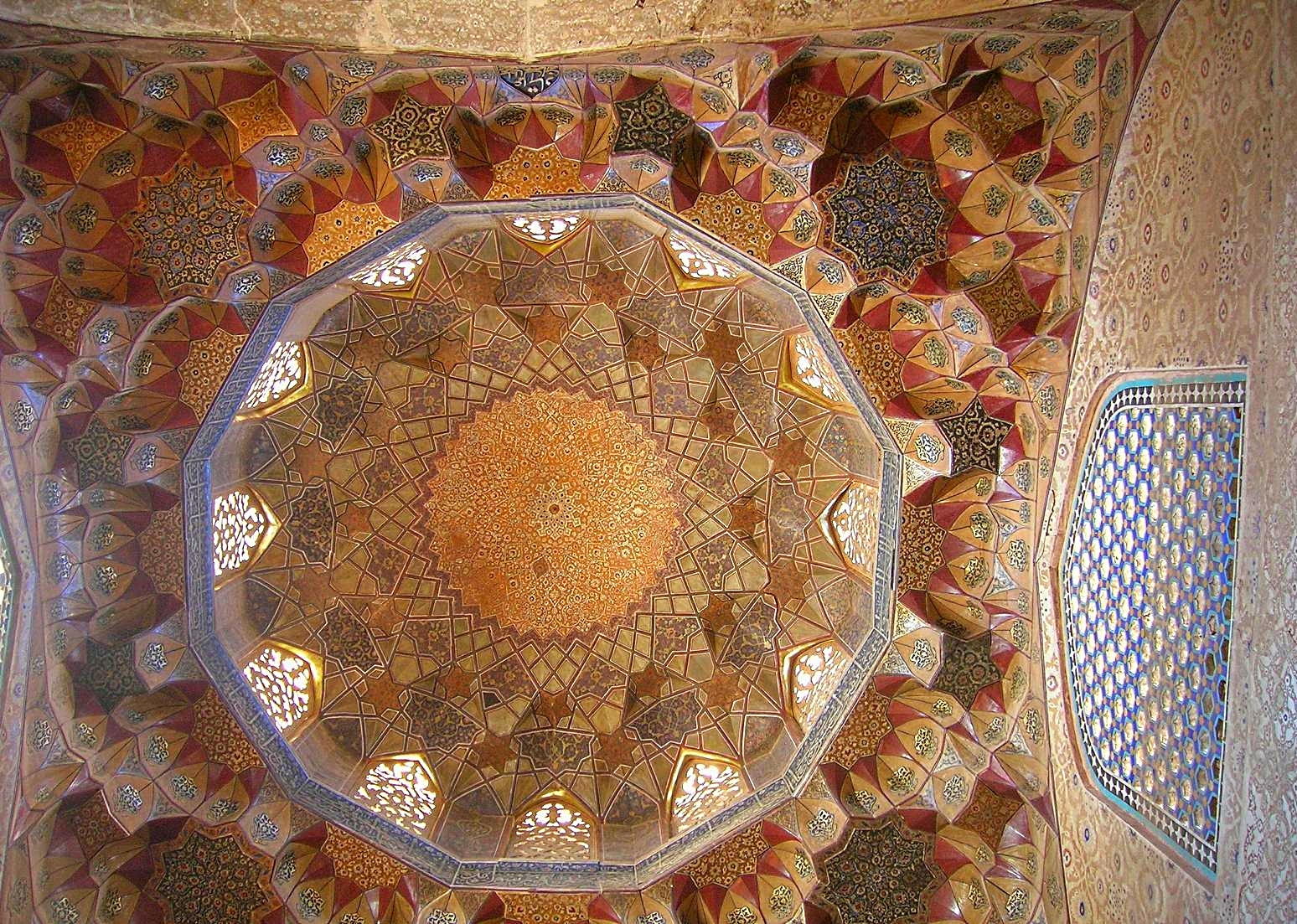
Ganjali Khan Mosque

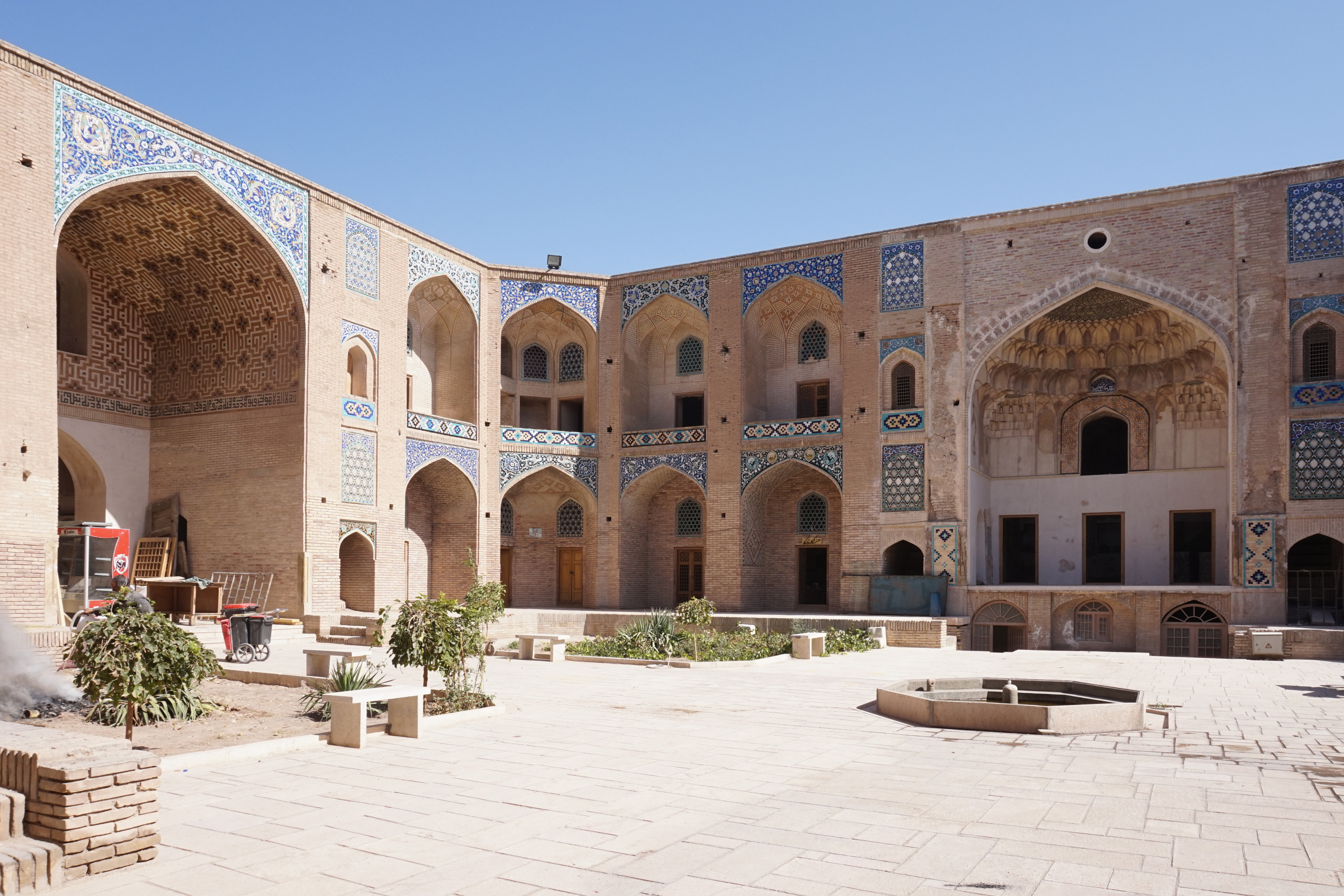
Ganjali Khan Caravanserai

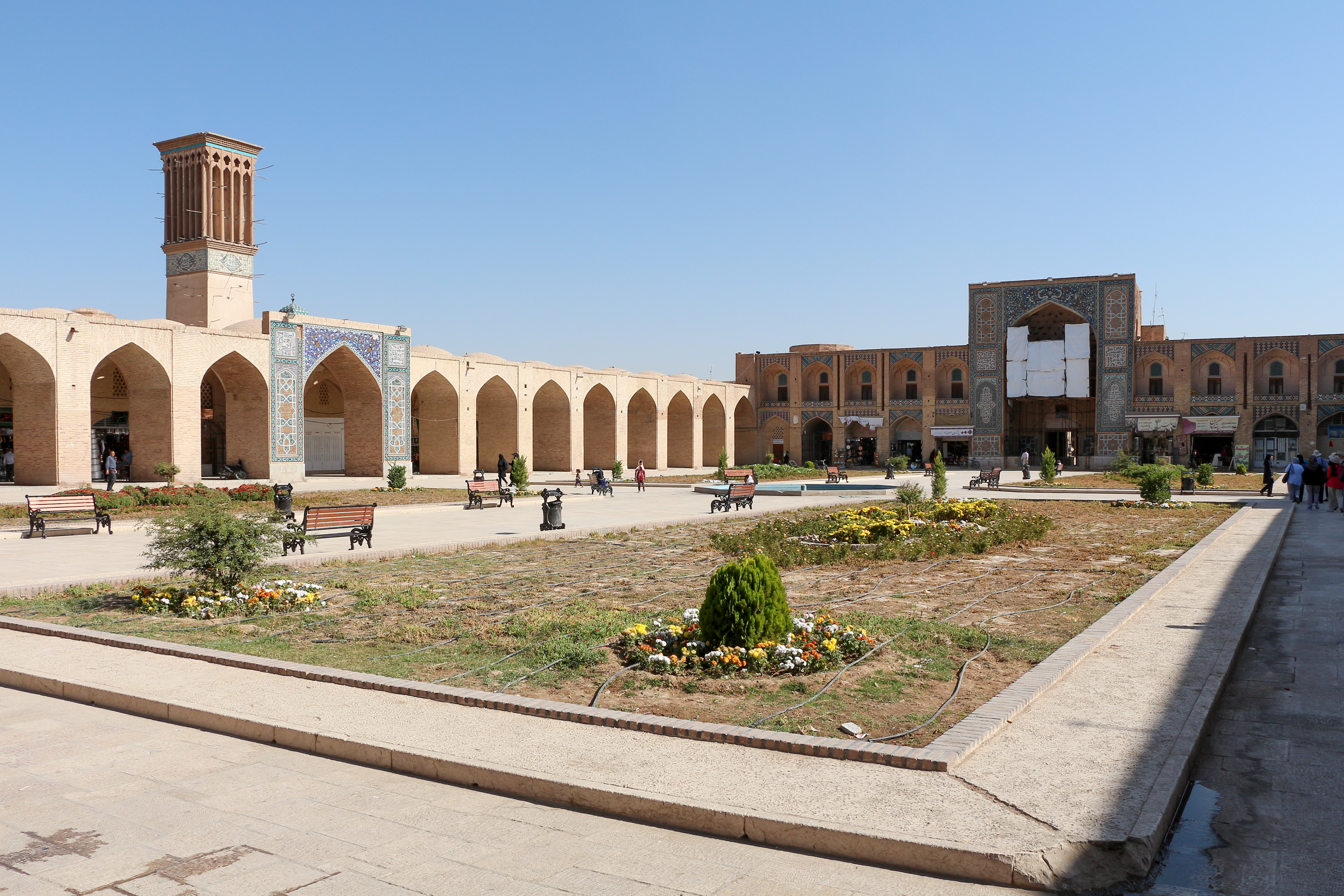
Ganjali Khan square

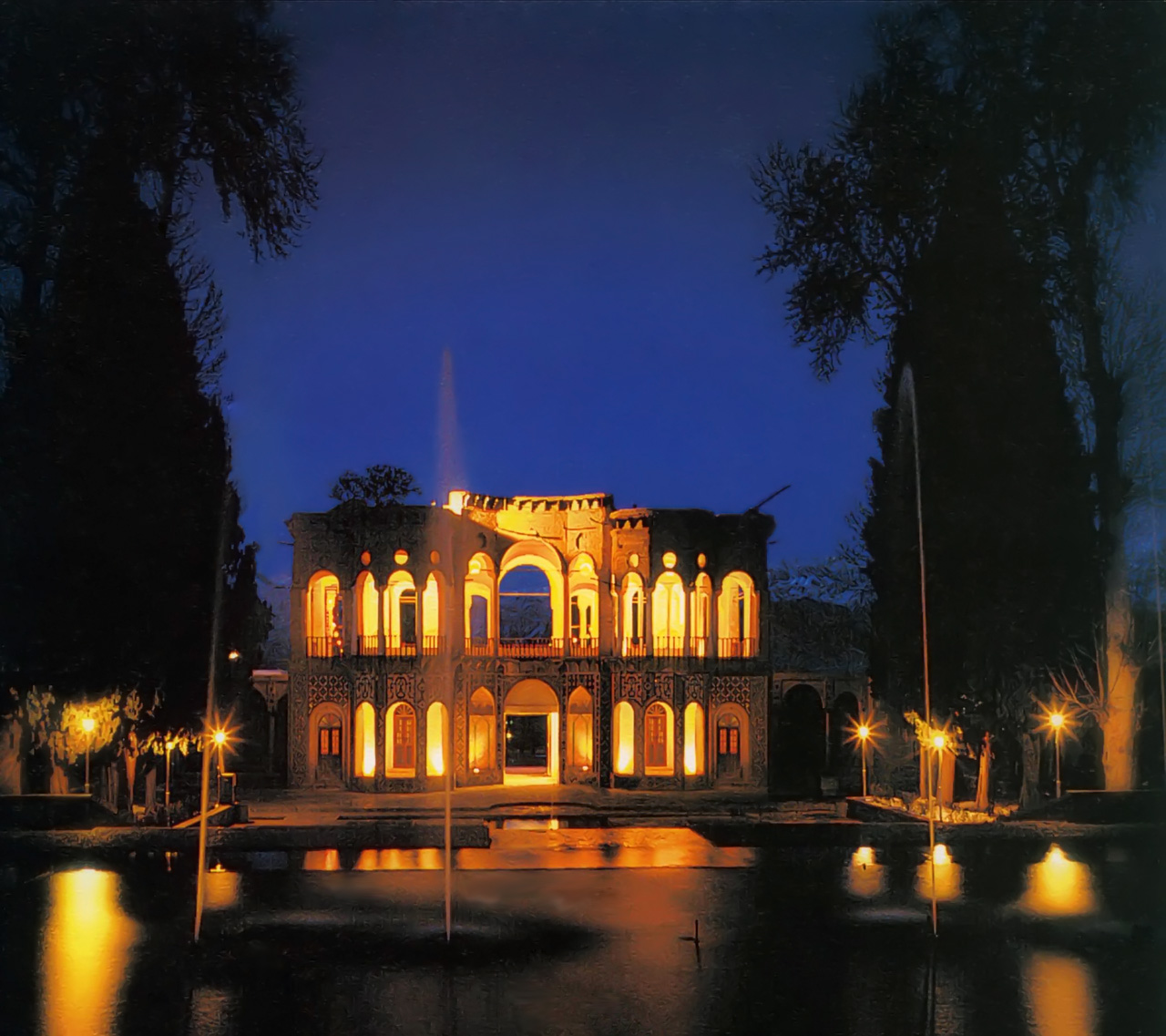
Shazdeh Garden (Prince's Garden)

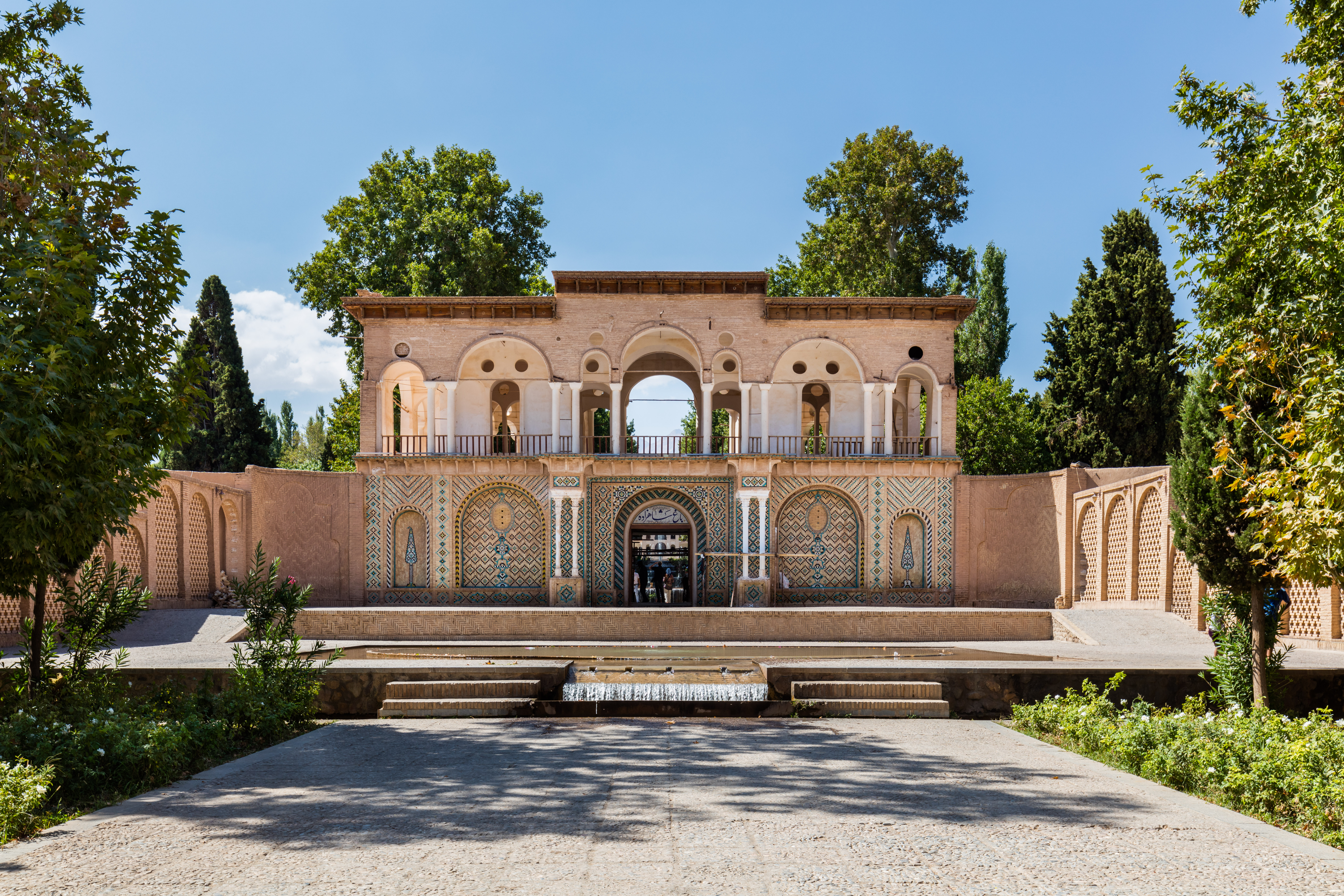
Shazdeh Garden

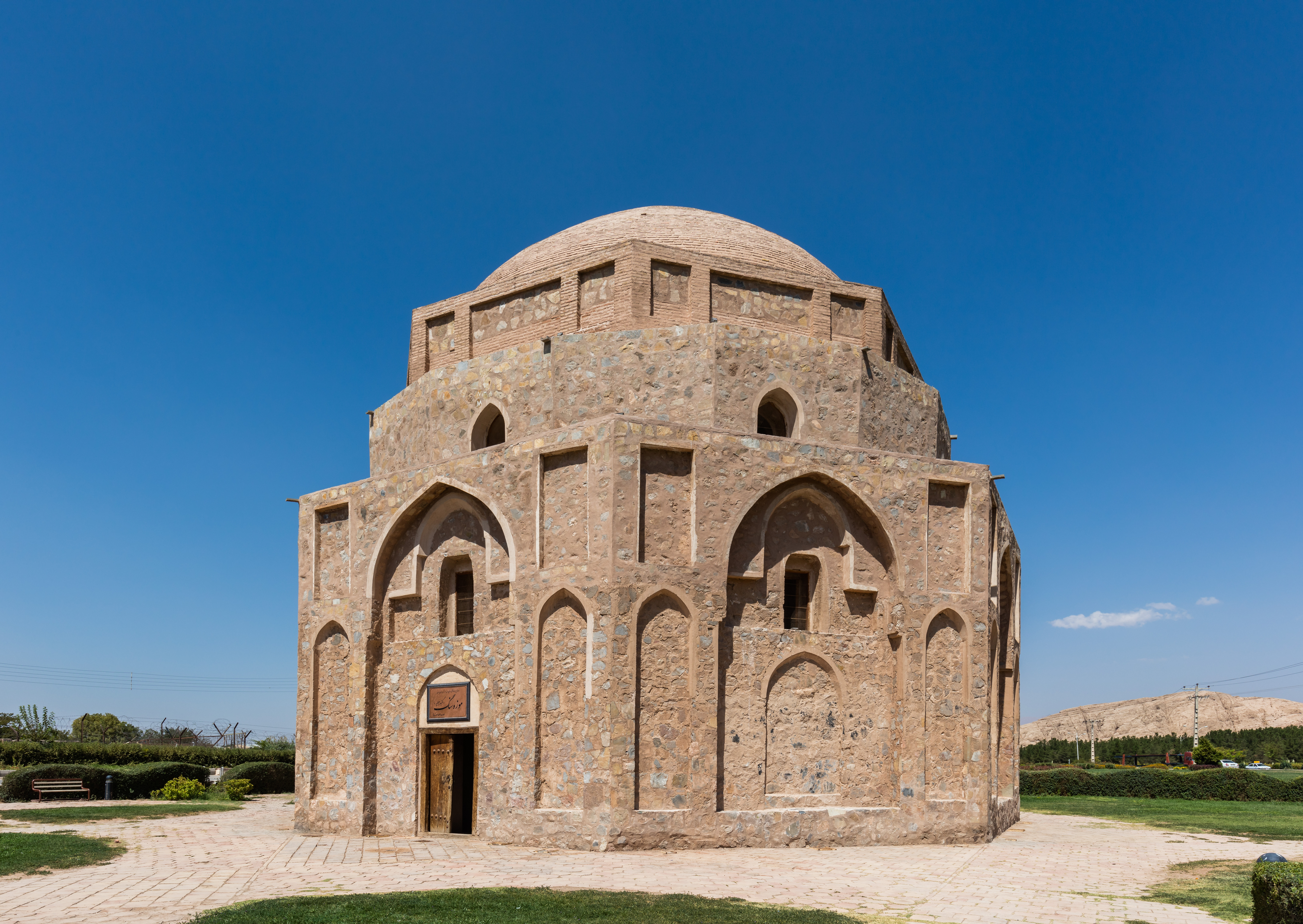
Jabalieh Dome

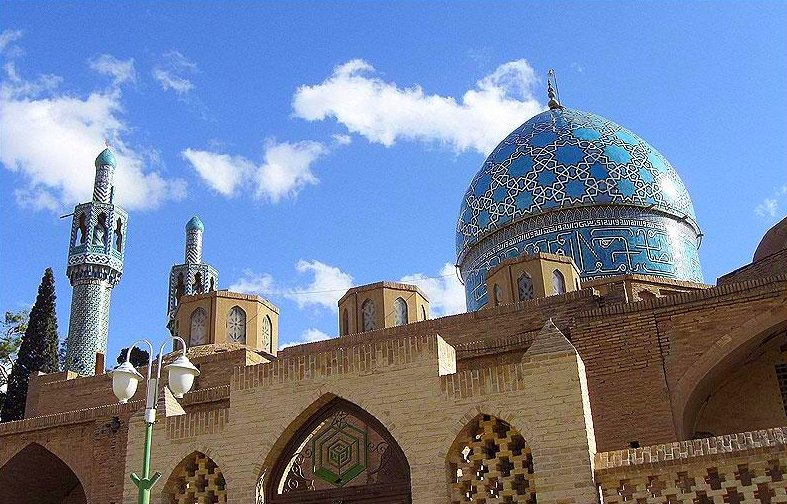
Shah Nimatullah Wali holy shrine

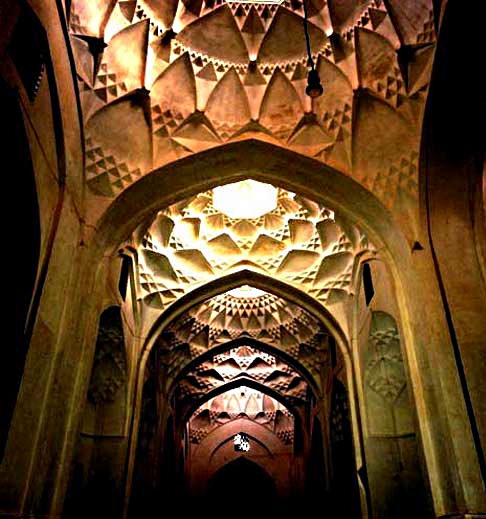
Shah Nimatullah Wali holy shrine (praying hall)

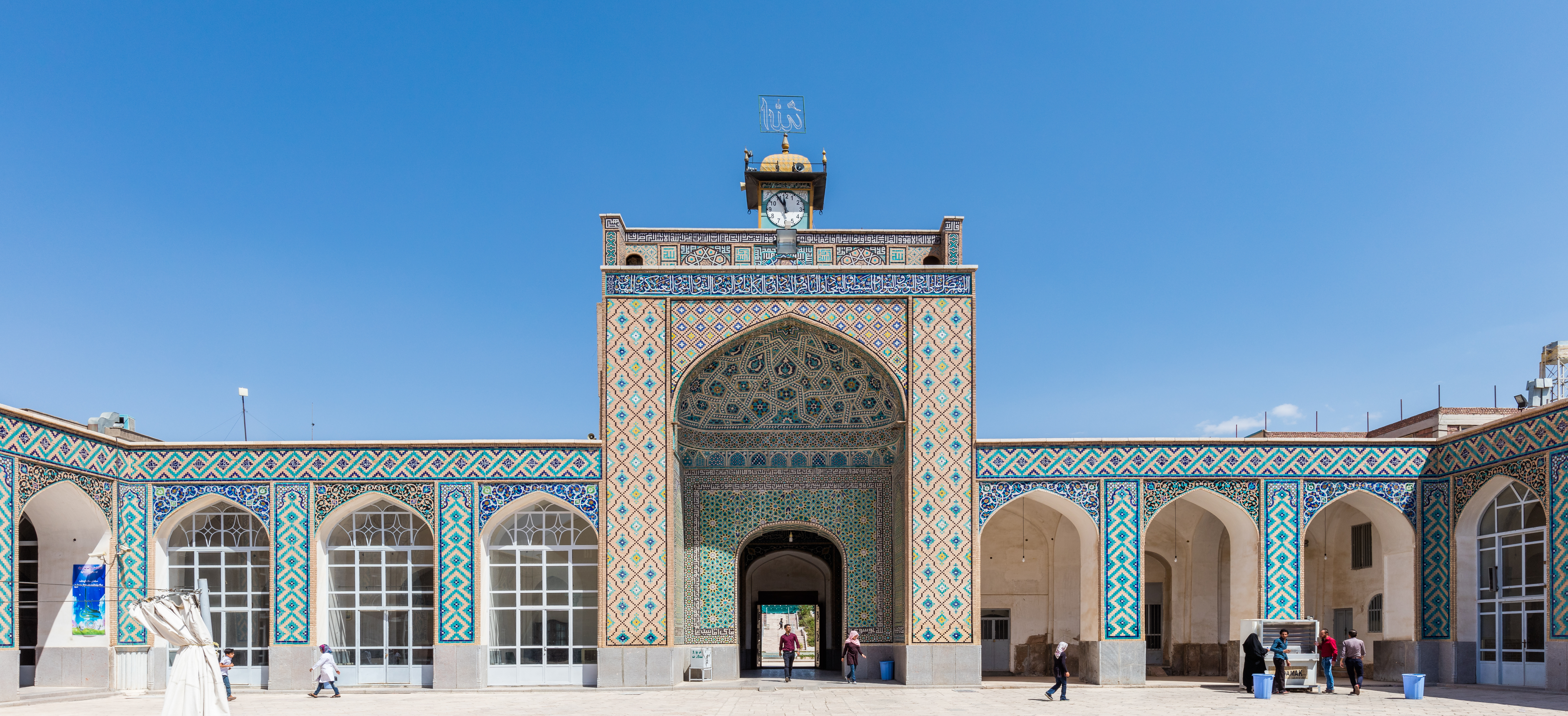
Entrance to Kerman's Jameh Mosque (also known as Friday Mosque)

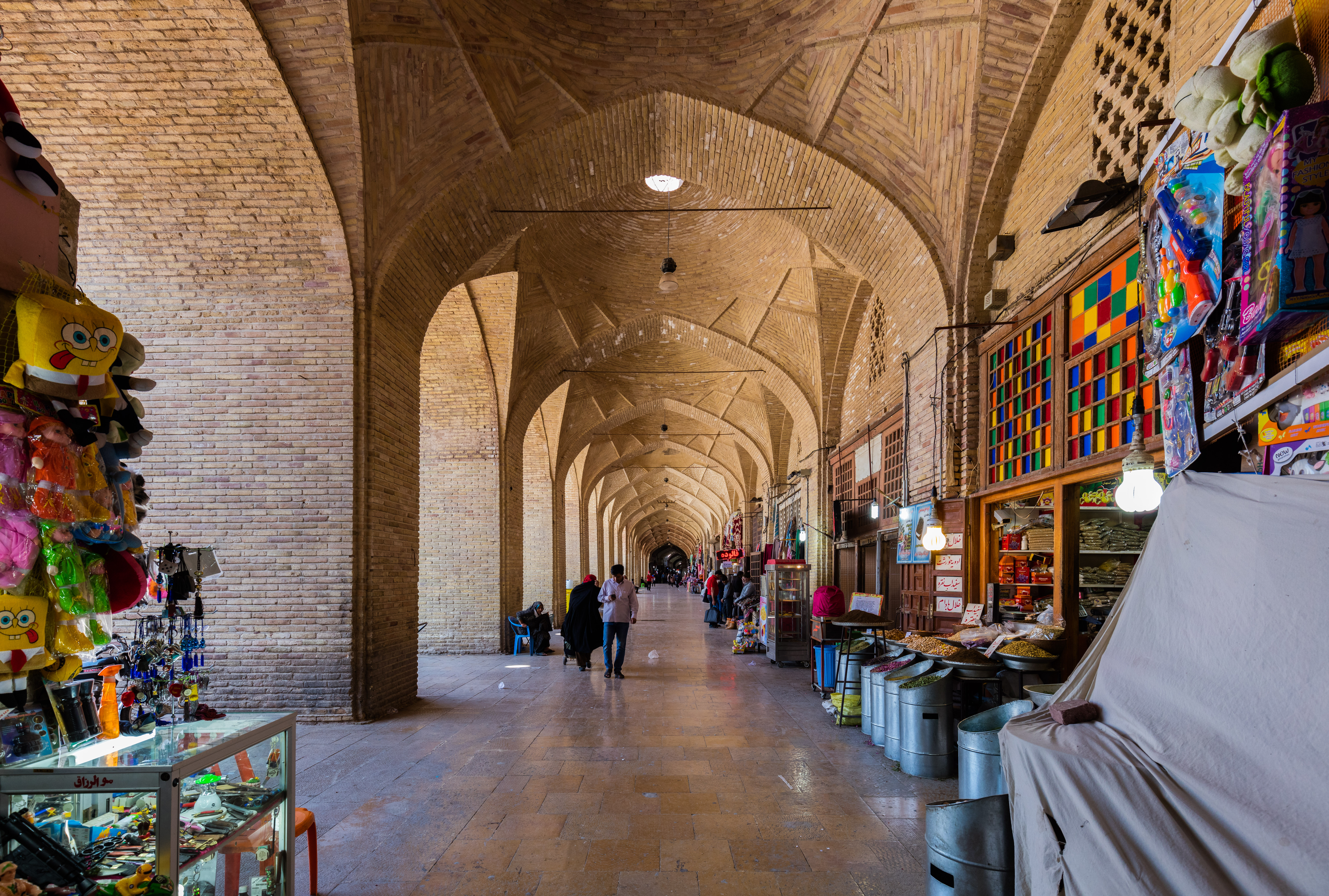
Kerman's Grand Bazaar

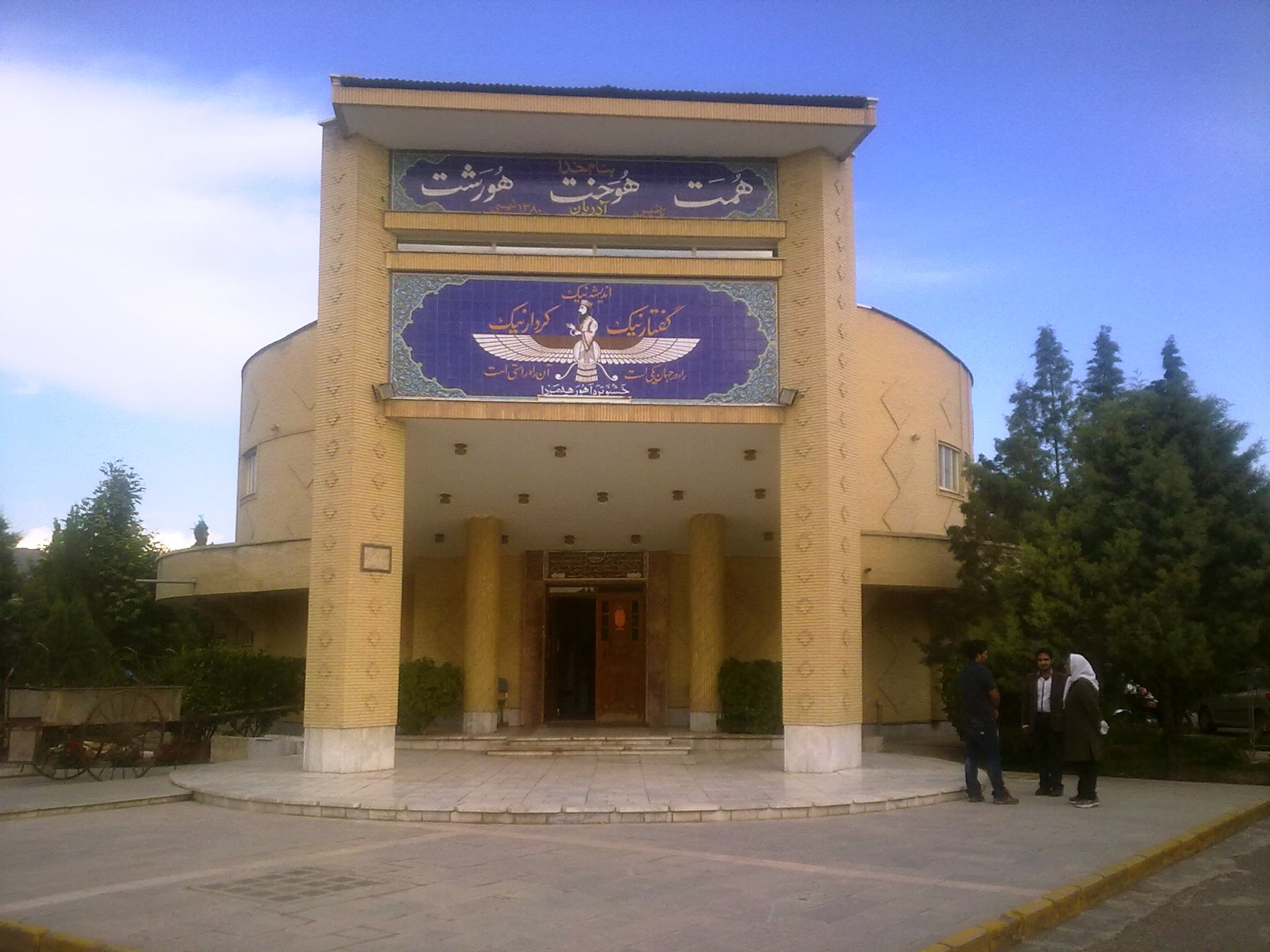
Museum of Zoroastrians

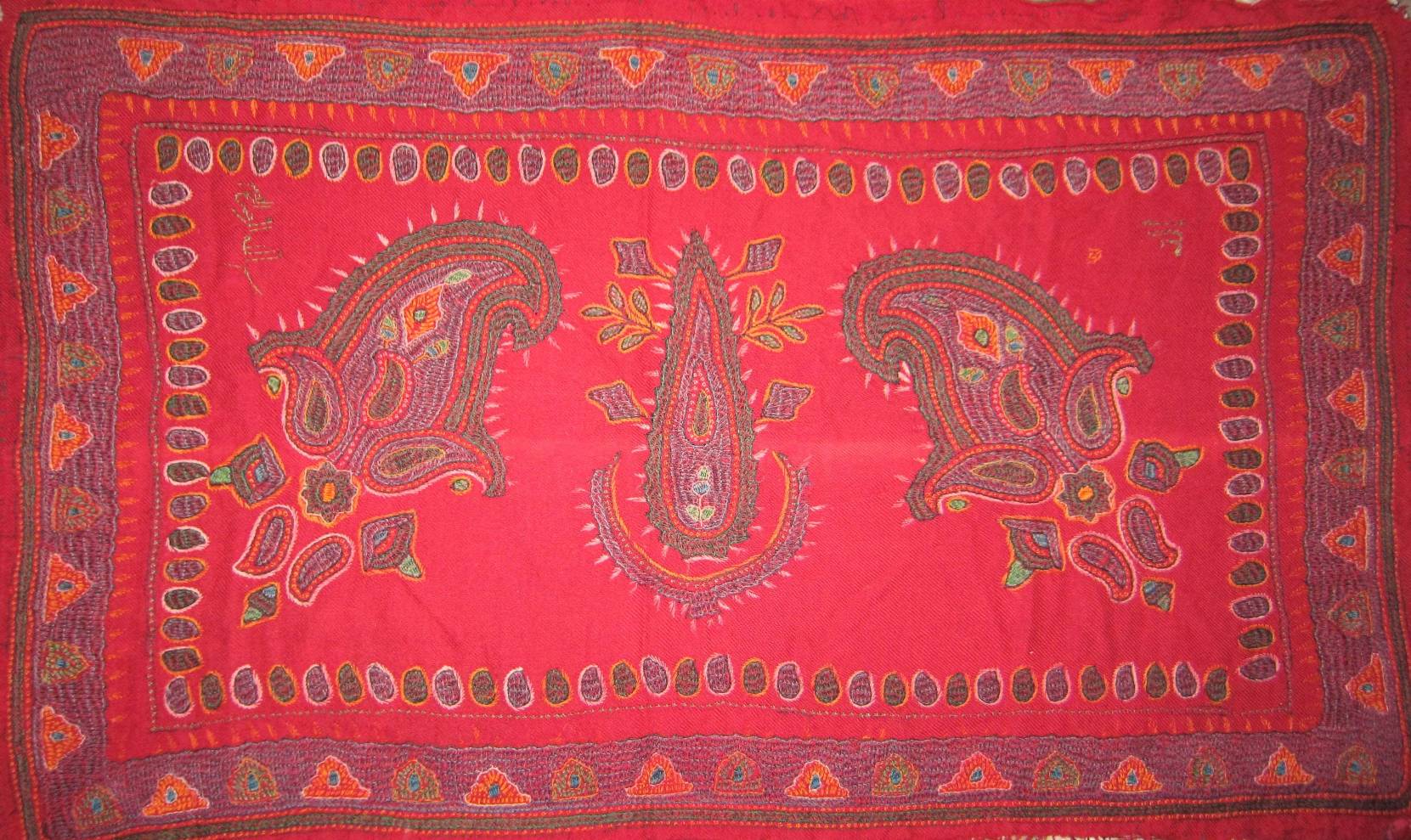
Kerman's Patteh

Kerman Pars Hotel

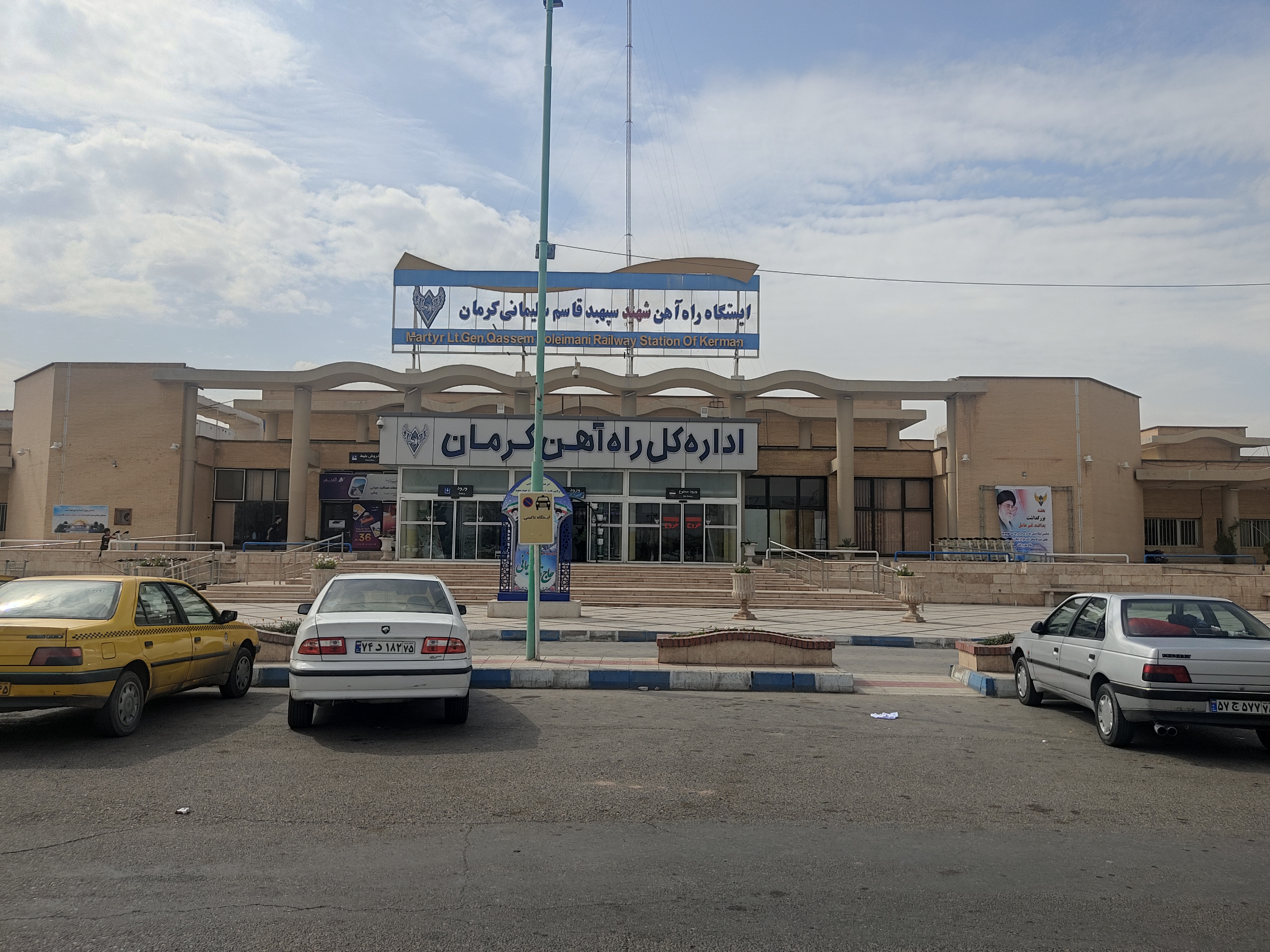
Kerman Railway Station

== See also ==
- Arg e Bam
- Ganjali Khan Complex
- Jabalieh
- Kerman carpet
- List of Safavid governors of Kerman
- Pateh
- Shazdeh Garden
- Shahid Bahonar University of Kerman
