= Fire Temple of Kerman =

Zoroastrian fire temple in Kerman, Iran

Kerman Fire Temple
- آتشکدهٔ کرمان
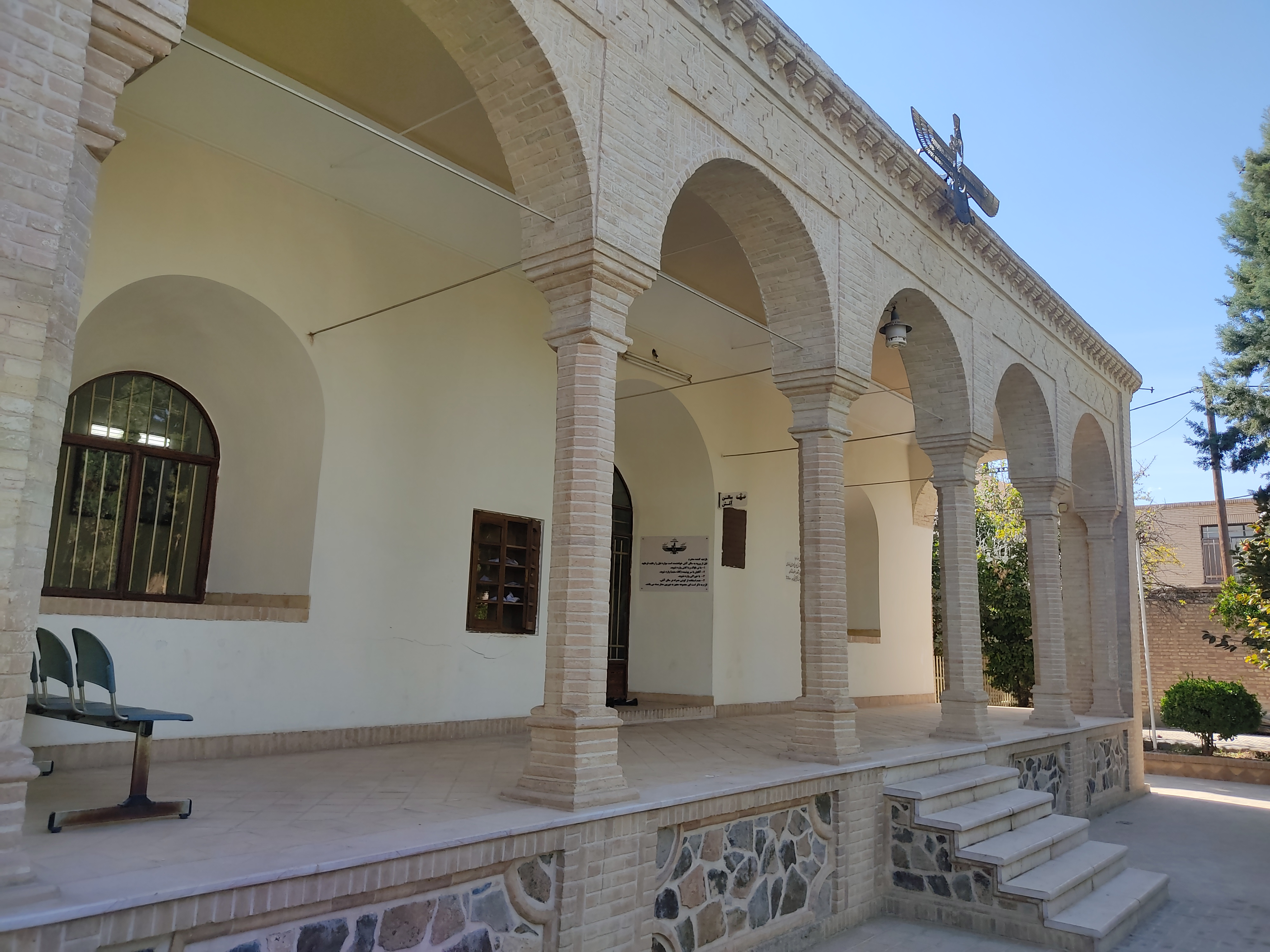

Religion
- Affiliation: Zoroastrianism

Location
- Location: Kerman, Iran
- Interactive map of Kerman Fire Temple

Architecture
- Style: Pahlavi Architecture
- Established: 1924

The Kerman Fire Temple (Persian: آتشکدهٔ کرمان) is a Zoroastrian fire temple in Kerman, Iran. The structure is also the house to the only anthropology museum of Zoroastrians in the world.

== History ==
The temple was built in 1924 during the reign of Reza Shah Pahlavi. The fire contained in it was transferred from India and is said to have originated from Adur Farnbag, one of the three holiest fires during the Sasanian era.

The idea to make the place a museum was first expressed in 1983. In 2005, the museum was finally inaugurated. It contains a handwritten version of the Gathas estimated to be at least 200 years old.

It was listed among the Iranian national heritage sites with the number 4190 on 2 October 2001.

== Gallery ==
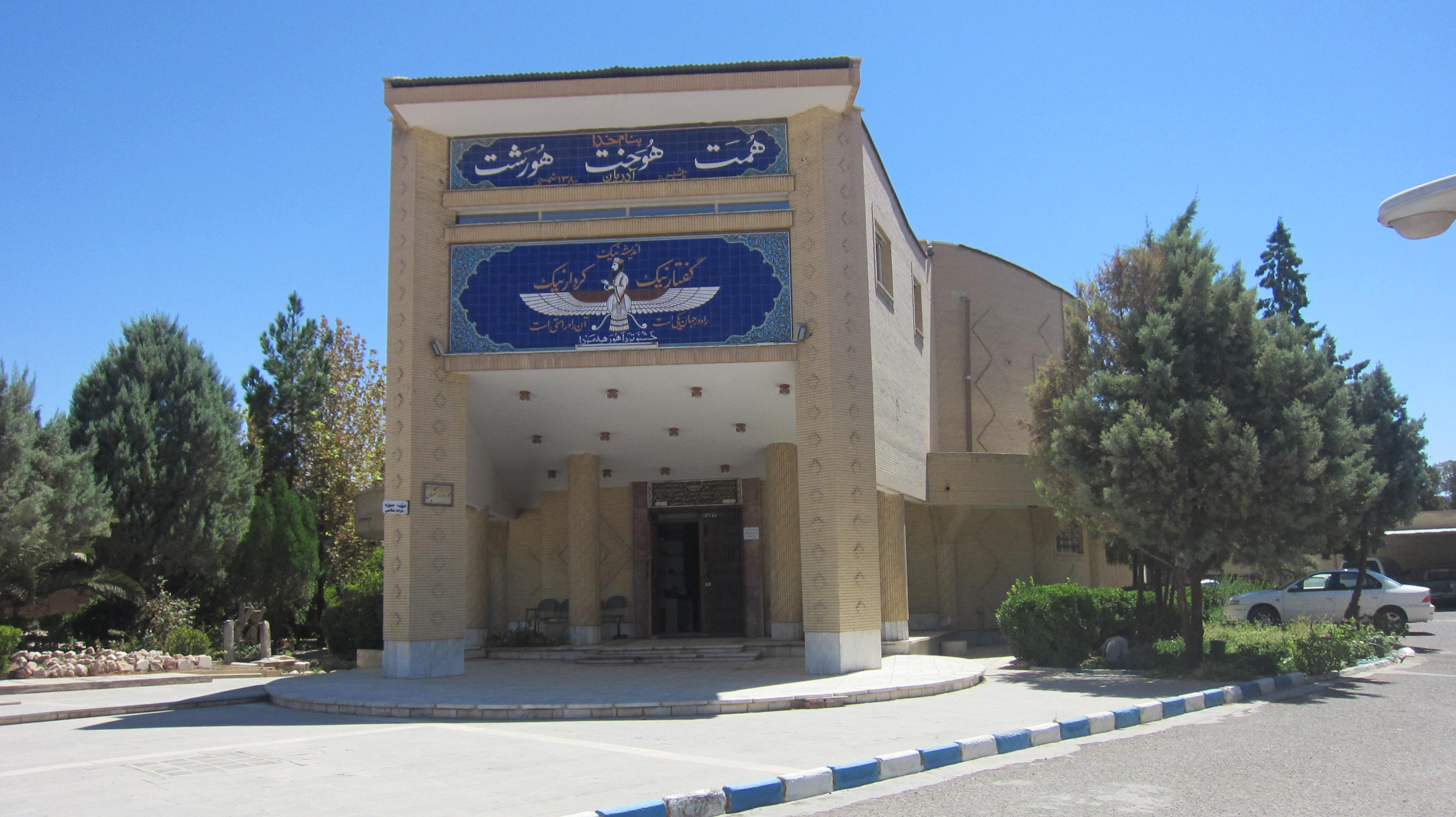

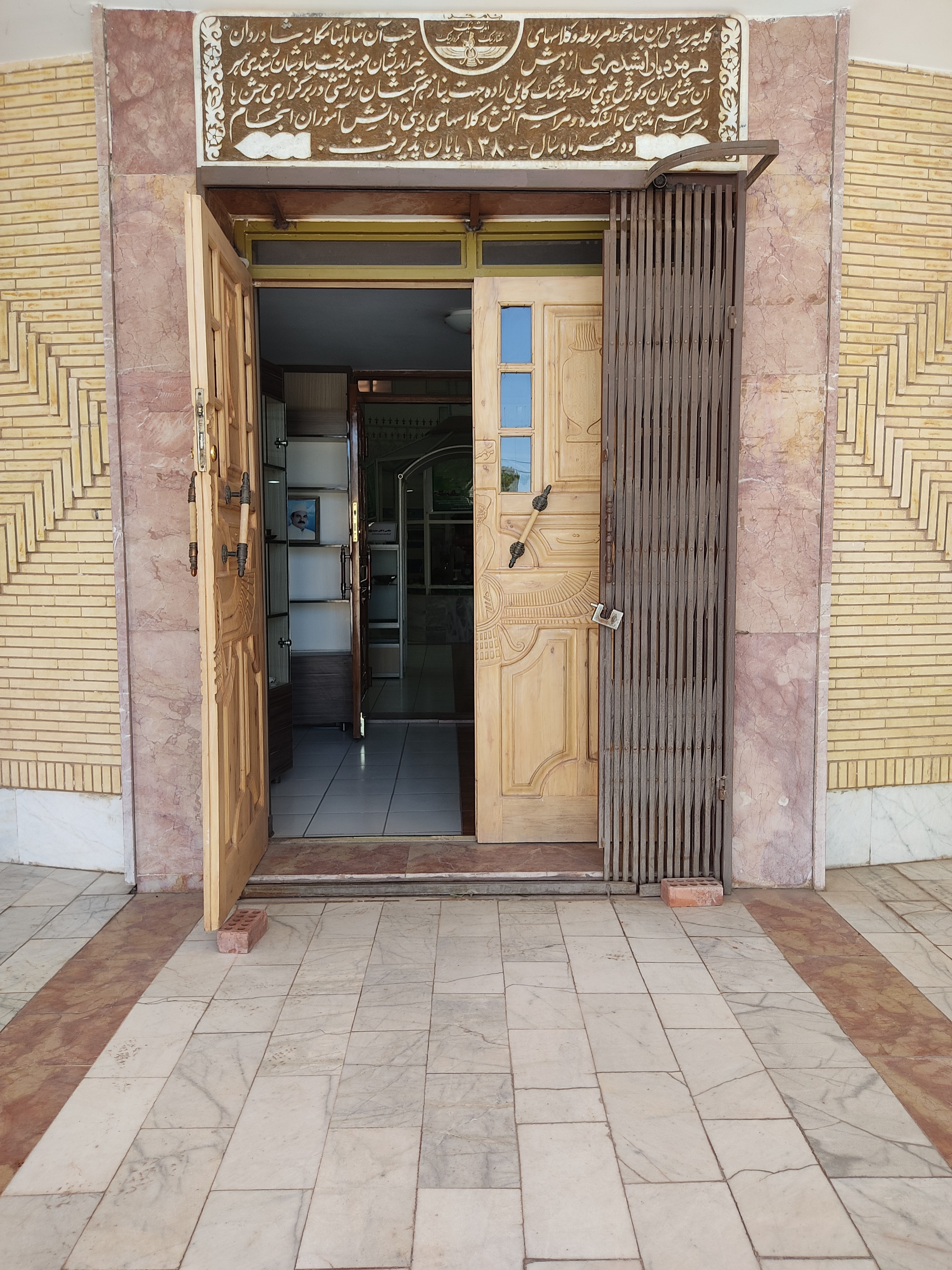

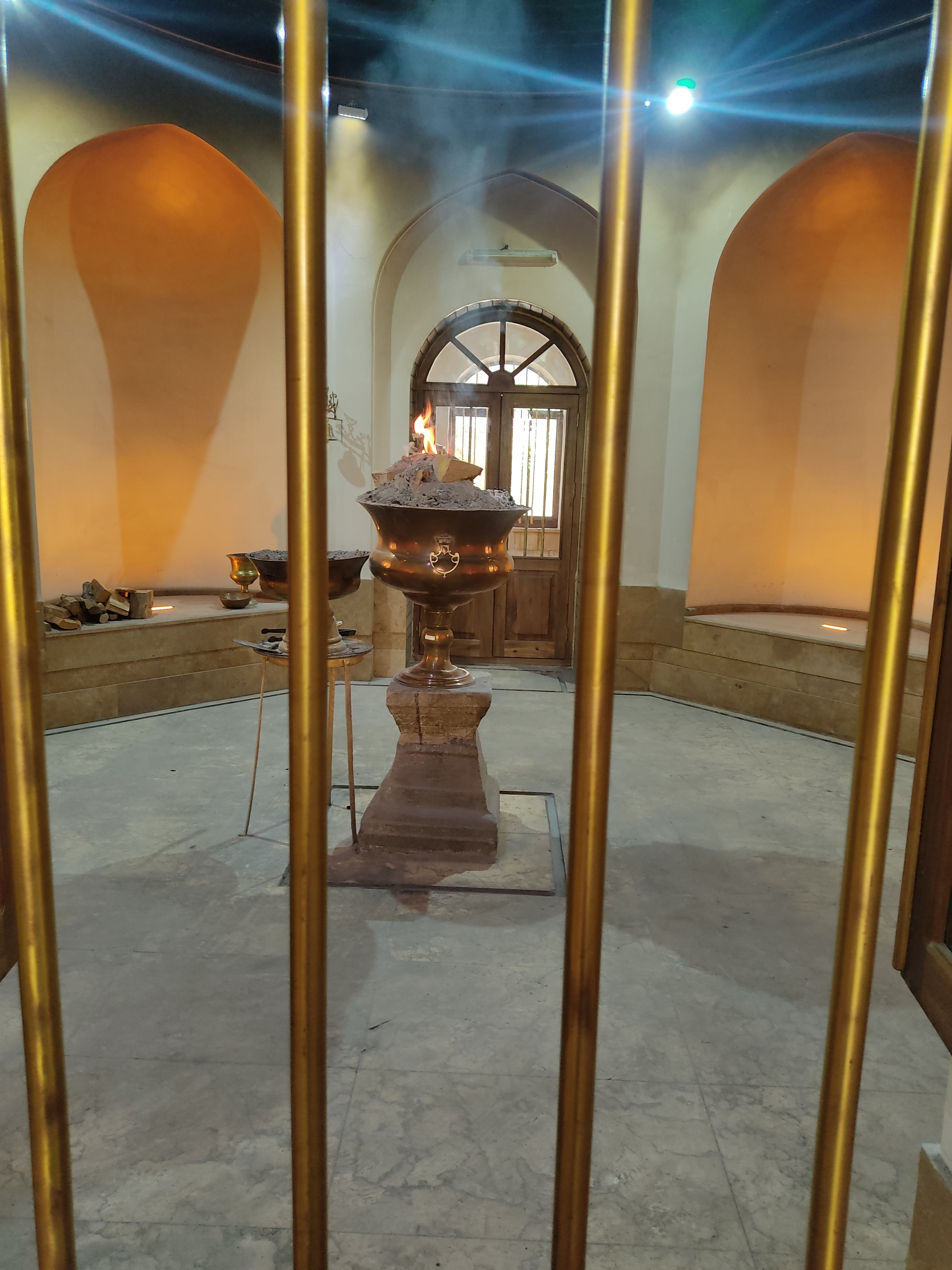

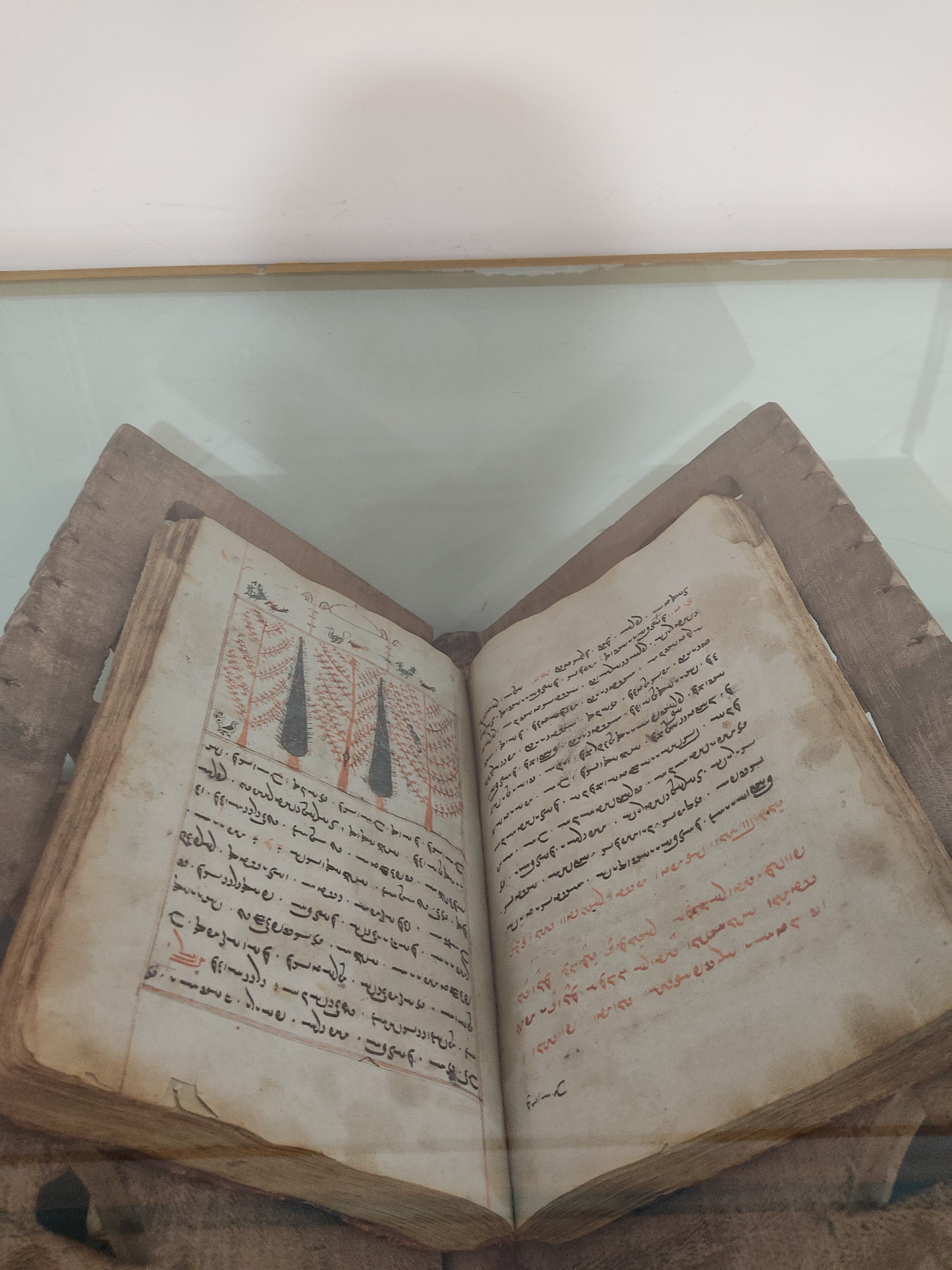

== See also ==
- Fire Temple of Yazd
