= Dome of Jabalieh =

Historic building in Kerman, Iran

- گنبد جبلیه
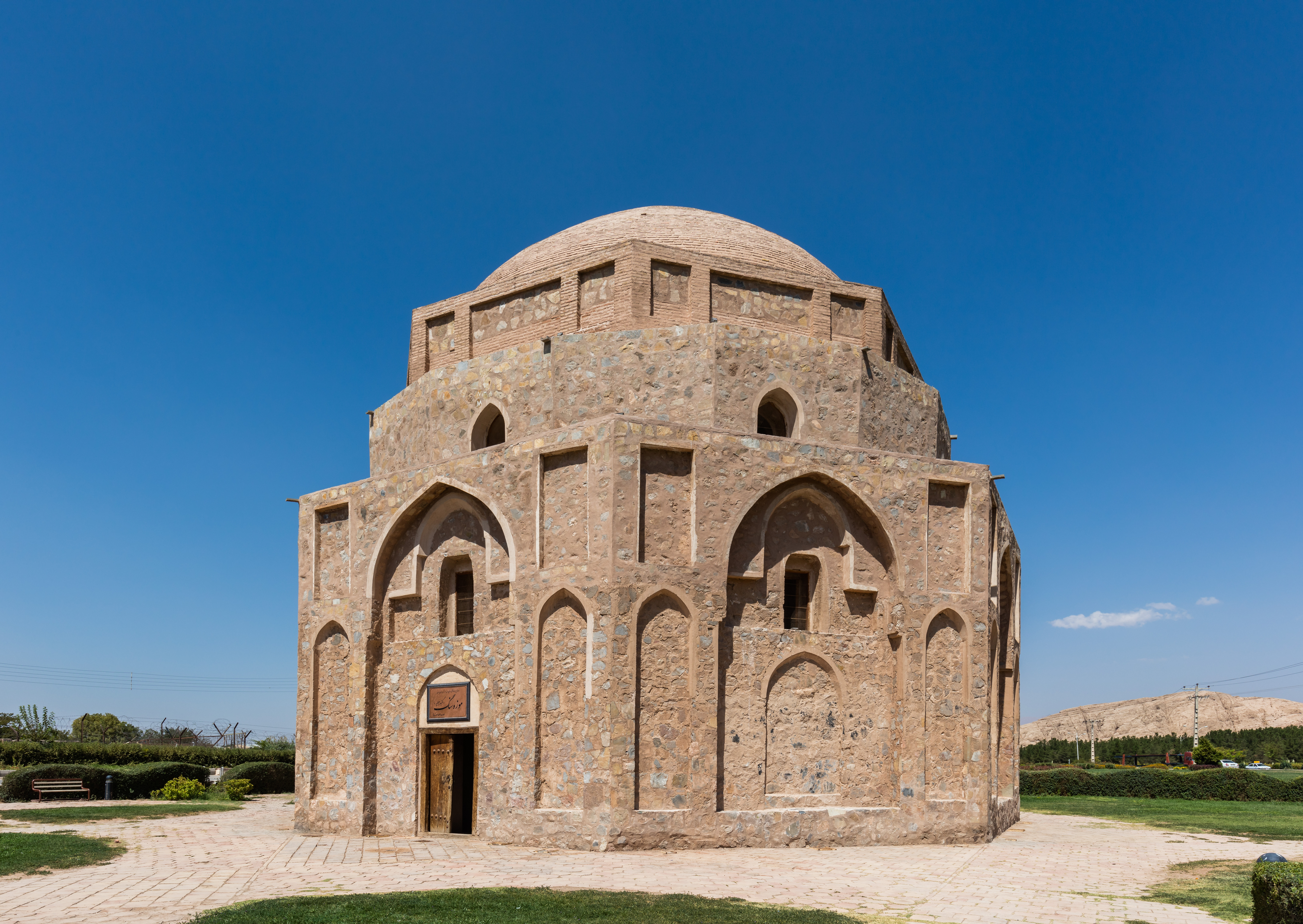

General information
- Location: Kerman, Iran

Iran National Heritage List
- Official name: Dome of Jabalieh
- Type: Dome
- Designated: 1937
- Reference no.: 296
- Conservation organization: Cultural Heritage, Handicrafts and Tourism Organization of Iran

Dome of Jabalieh (Persian: گنبد جبلیه) or Rock Dome, also known as the Gabri Dome, is located in Kerman, Iran. It is a 12th-century structure unique for its stone masonry, making it one of the finest examples of this construction style from the Islamic period in Iran. The dome is made of stone and brick, though the building is of stone and gypsum, and its architectural elements take inspiration from Sasanian architecture.

The rocky outcrops oarchitectureing the Martyrs Cemetery just south-east of the Gonbad-e Jabalieh offer a fine outlook over Kerman, if one manages to climb to the top.

== Gallery ==
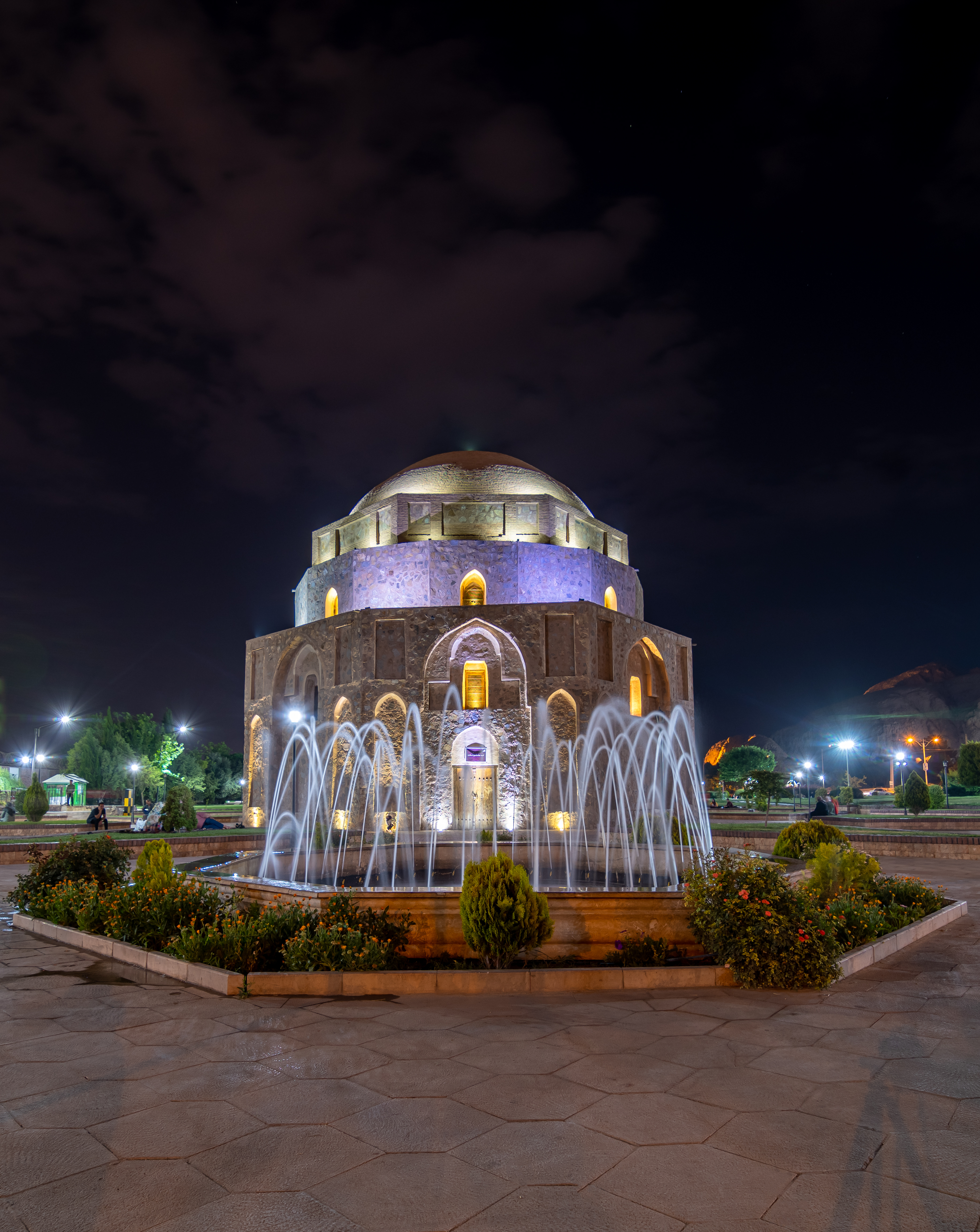
The Dome at night, 2023

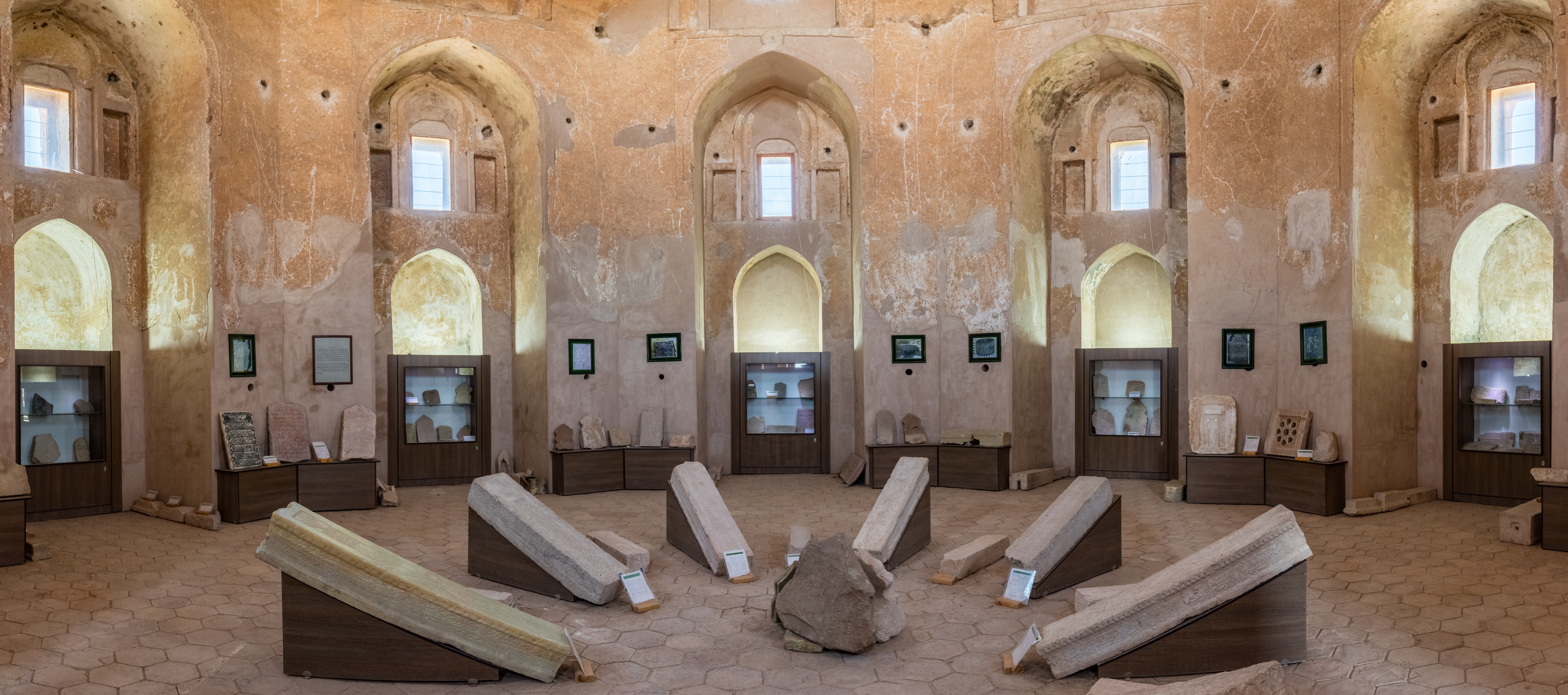
Interior, 2016

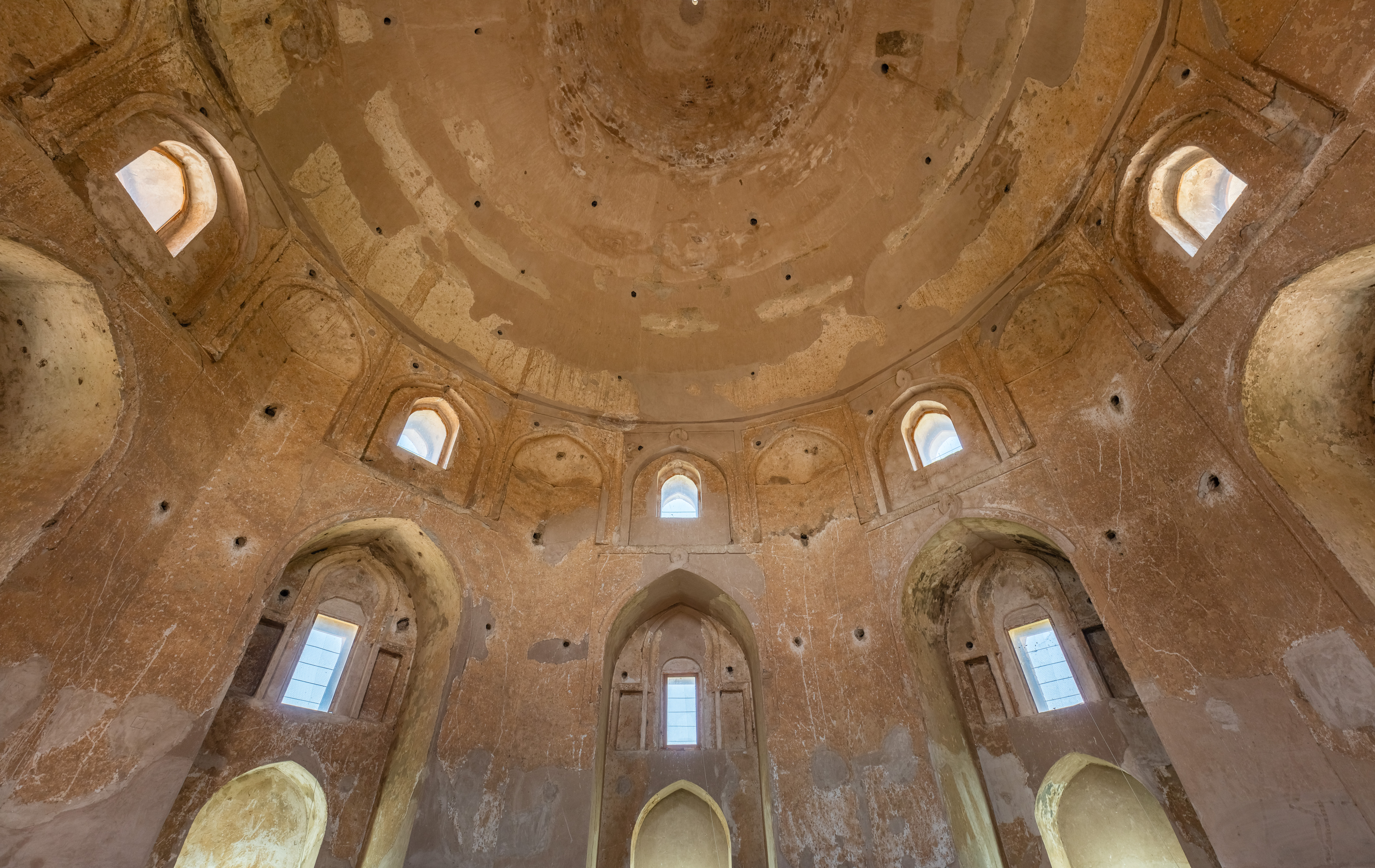
Interior, 2016
