= Goatwood =

Goatwood is a common name for several plants and may refer to:

- Cassipourea guianensis
- Coprosma prisca
