= Arts of Iran =

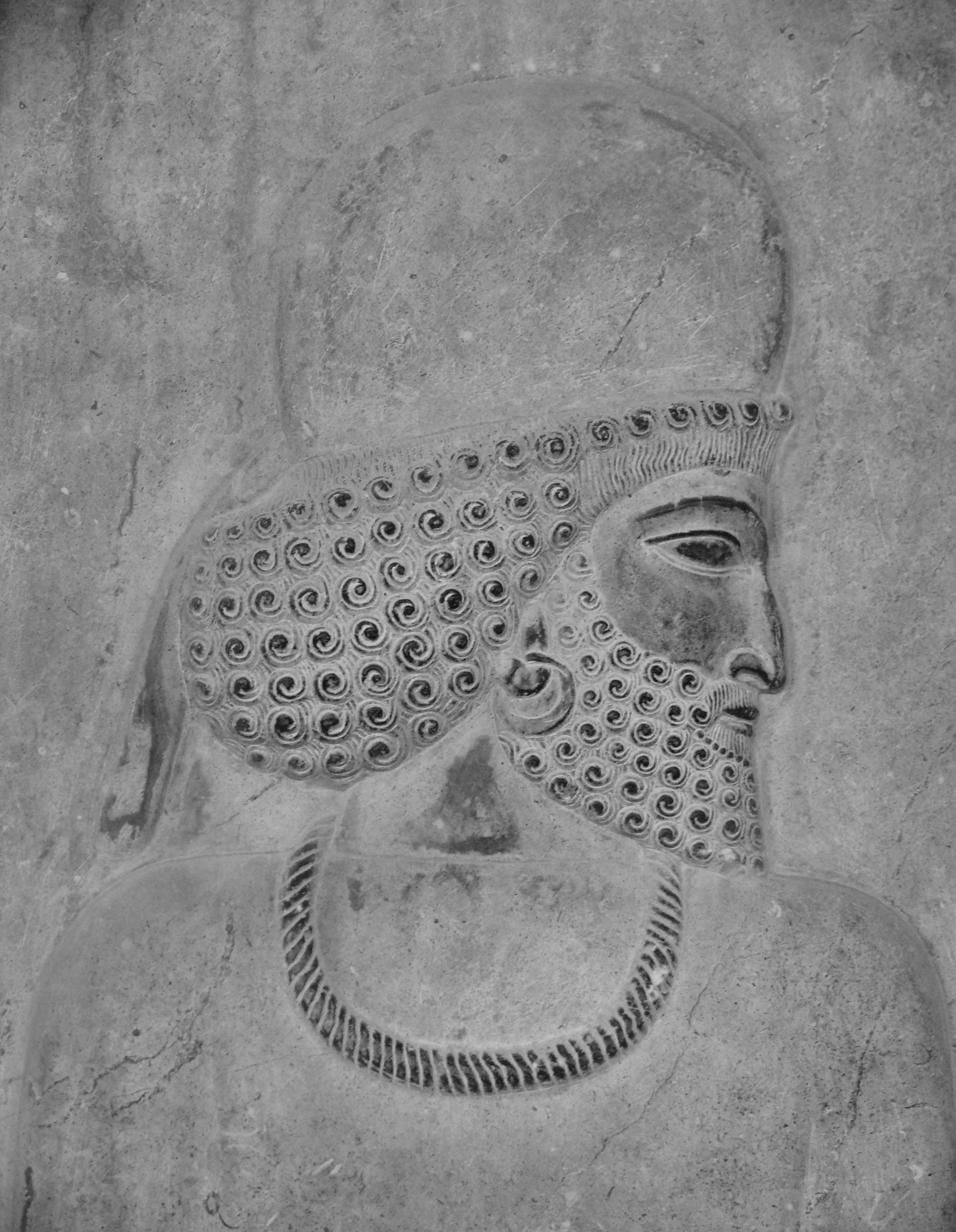
Median man in Persepolis.

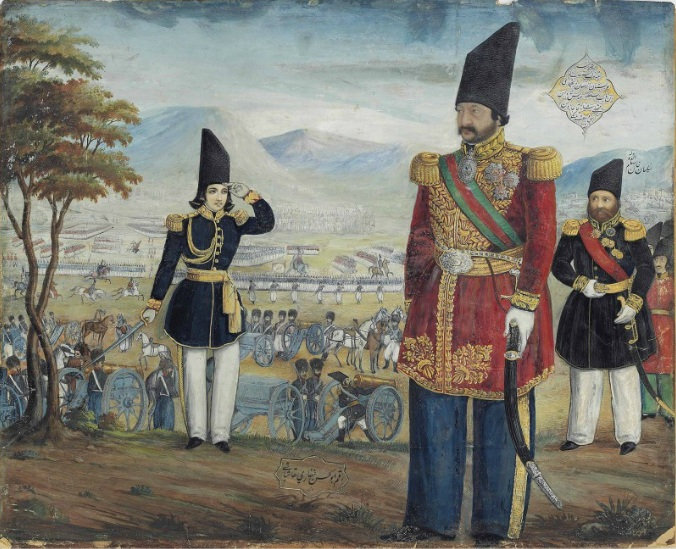
Persian realist Gouache painting of the Qajar dynasty and soldiers in 1850-1851.

The Arts of Iran include a variety of traditional disciplines, including architecture, painting, literature, music, weaving, pottery, calligraphy, and metalwork.

Today, there is an active modern Iranian art scene, including cinema and photography. For a history of Persian visual art up to the early 20th century, see Persian art or Iranian architecture.

Arian Jalali

== Persian fine arts ==
=== The Persian rug ===
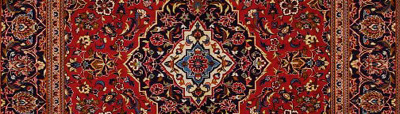
Every part of the Persian rug is traditionally handmade from natural ingredients over many months, from the yarn fiber to the colors.

The art of rug weaving has its roots in the culture and customs of Persia. Weavers mix patterns with a wide variety of colors, which are usually extracted from wildflowers. The Iranian carpets often depict Persian gardens: full of flora, birds, and beasts.

Rug fabric is often washed in tea to soften its texture. Patterns and designs vary depending on the type of fabric and where it is made. Some rugs, such as Gabbeh and Gelim, have variations in their textures and visual features (e.g. number of knots). Out of about 2 million Iranians who work in the trade, 1.2 million are weavers, producing the largest amount of hand woven artistic carpets in the world. In 2002, Iranian carpet exports totalled $517 million.

The craftsmanship and quality in weaving these carpets and silken textiles caught the attention of the likes of Xuanzang, Jean-Baptiste Tavernier, and Jean Chardin.

=== Painting and miniature ===
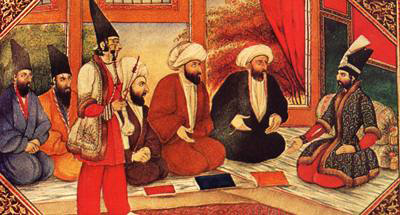
Mullahs in the royal presence. The painting style is markedly Qajari.

Oriental historian Basil Gray believes Iran (Persia) "has a unique art that is excellent in its kind."

Caves in Iran's Lorestan province exhibit painted imagery of animals and hunting scenes. Some, such as those in Fars province and Sialk, are believed to be at least 5,000 years old.

Painting in Iran is thought to have reached its historical climax to the outside word's consensus during the Tamerlane era when masters such as Kamaleddin Behzad invented a new style of painting in the Persian miniature.

Paintings of the Qajar period are a combination of European influences and Safavid miniature schools of painting such as those introduced by Reza Abbasi. Masters such as Kamal-ol-Molk further pushed forward the European influence in Iran. It was during the Qajar era that "Coffee House painting" emerged. Subjects of this style were often religious in nature, depicting scenes from Shia epics and the like.

=== Pottery and ceramics ===
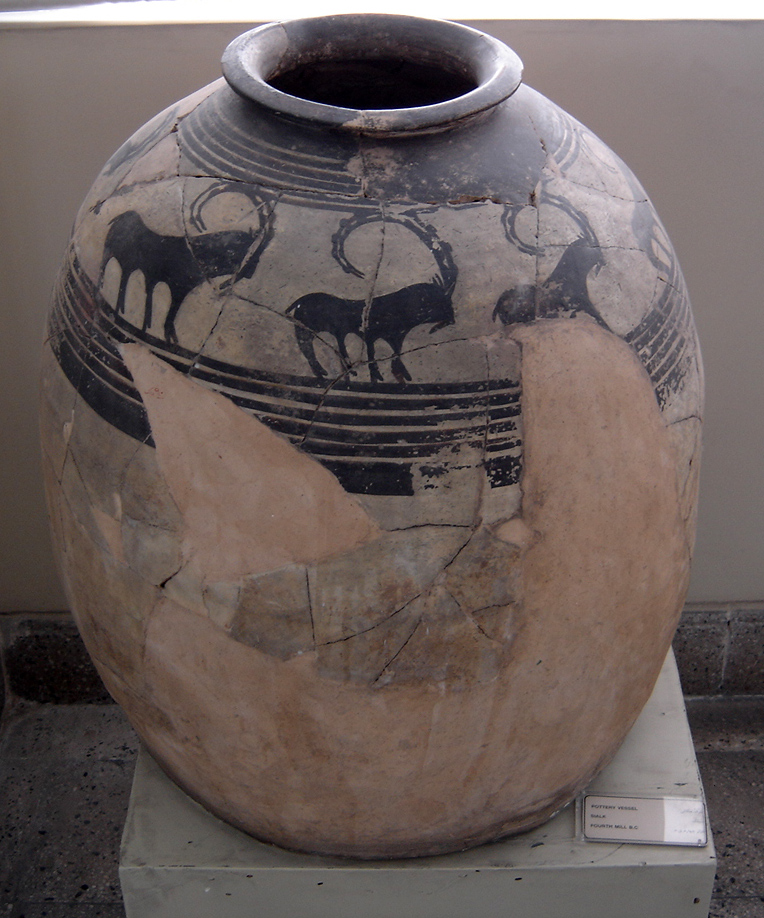
Pottery Vessel, fourth millennium BC. The Sialk collection of Tehran's National Museum of Iran

One of the prominent archeologist Roman Ghirshman believes that "the taste and talent of this people [Iranians] can be seen through the designs of their earthen wares."

Of the thousands of archeological sites and historic ruins of Iran, almost every single one can be found to have been filled with earthenware at some point. Thousands of unique vessels were found in Sialk and Jiroft sites.

The occupation of the potter "kuzeh gar"(Persian=کوزه‌گر) has a special place in Persian literature.

=== Music ===
In Iran's recorded history, the music developed is characterized by accompaniment with numerous musical instruments, several of which came to be the first prototypes of some modern musical instruments of the present.

The earliest references to musicians in Iran are found in Susa and Elam in the 3rd millennium BC. Reliefs, sculptures, and mosaics such as those in Bishapur from periods of antiquity depict a musical culture.

Persian music in its contemporary form has its inception in the Naseri era, who ordered the opening of a "House of Crafts," where master craftsmen would gather for designing instruments and practicing their art.

=== Literature ===
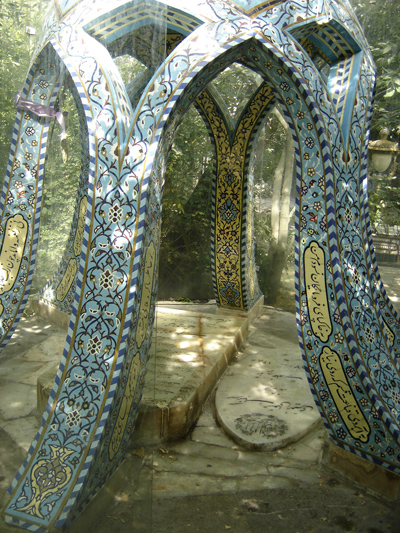
Iran is filled with tombs of poets and musicians, such as this one belonging to Rahi Mo'ayeri.

While many have also been written in prose, Iranian poetry is seen as particularly prominent in Persian history. The literature of Iran's direct and recently lost territories in the Caucasus (most notably Azerbaijan), as well as Turkey and indirectly the Mughal Empire developed under its influence.

Some notable Iranian poets include: Ferdowsi, Khayyam, Hafiz, Attar, Sa'di, Nizami, Sanai, Rudaki, Rumi, Jami, Nima Yushij and Shahriar.

=== Environmental design ===
==== Architecture ====
The architecture of Iran is one with an ancient Persian tradition and heritage. Arthur Pope stated, "the meaningful Impact of Persian architecture is versatile. Not overwhelming but dignified, magnificent and impressive".

==== Persian gardens ====
The tradition and style in the garden design of Persian gardens (Persian باغ ایرانی) has influenced the design of gardens from Andalusia to India and beyond. The gardens of the Alhambra show the influence of Persian Paradise garden philosophy and style in a Moorish Palace scale from the era of Al-Andalus in Spain. The Taj Mahal is one of the largest Persian Garden interpretations in the world, from the era of the Mughal Empire in India.

- Examples: see Category: Persian Gardens

=== Calligraphy ===
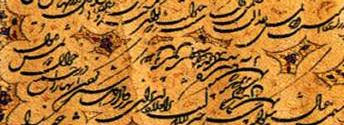
Persian calligraphy has several styles. Seen here is a "shekasteh" manuscript dated 1894, by Seyed Ali Akbar Golestaneh (سید علی اکبر گلستانه). A follower of the style of Darvish, his contemporaries were Mirza Hasan Isfahani (میرزا حسن اصفهانی), Mirza Kuchek Isfahani (میرزا کوچک اصفهانی), and Mohammad Ali Shirazi (محمد علی شیرازی). After his death, the Shekasteh style fell into stagnation until it was revived again later on in the 1970s.

The writer Will Durant says: "Ancient Iranians with an alphabet of 36 letters, used skins and pen to write, instead of earthen tablets. Such was the creativity spent on the art of writing." The significance of the art of calligraphy in works of pottery, metallic vessels, and historic buildings is such that they are deemed lacking without the adorning decorative calligraphy.

Illuminations, especially in the Quran and works such as the Shahnameh, Divan Hafez, Golestan, Bostan et al. are recognized as valuable because of their calligraphy alone. Vast quantities of these are scattered and preserved in museums and private collections worldwide, such as the Hermitage Museum of St. Petersburg and Washington's Freer Gallery of Art among many others. Styles:

- Shekasteh
- Nasta'liq
- Naskh
- Mohaqqaq

=== Tilework ===
Two famous techniques of tilework in Iran are Mo'araq and Haft-rang. Tileworks are a unique feature of blue mosques. In the past, Kashan (literally meaning "land of tiles") and Tabriz were the two famous centers of Iranian mosaic and tile industry.

=== Ayeneh-kari ===
Ayeneh-kari is an Iranian interior decoration where artists assemble finely cut mirrors together in geometric, calligraphic or foliage forms.

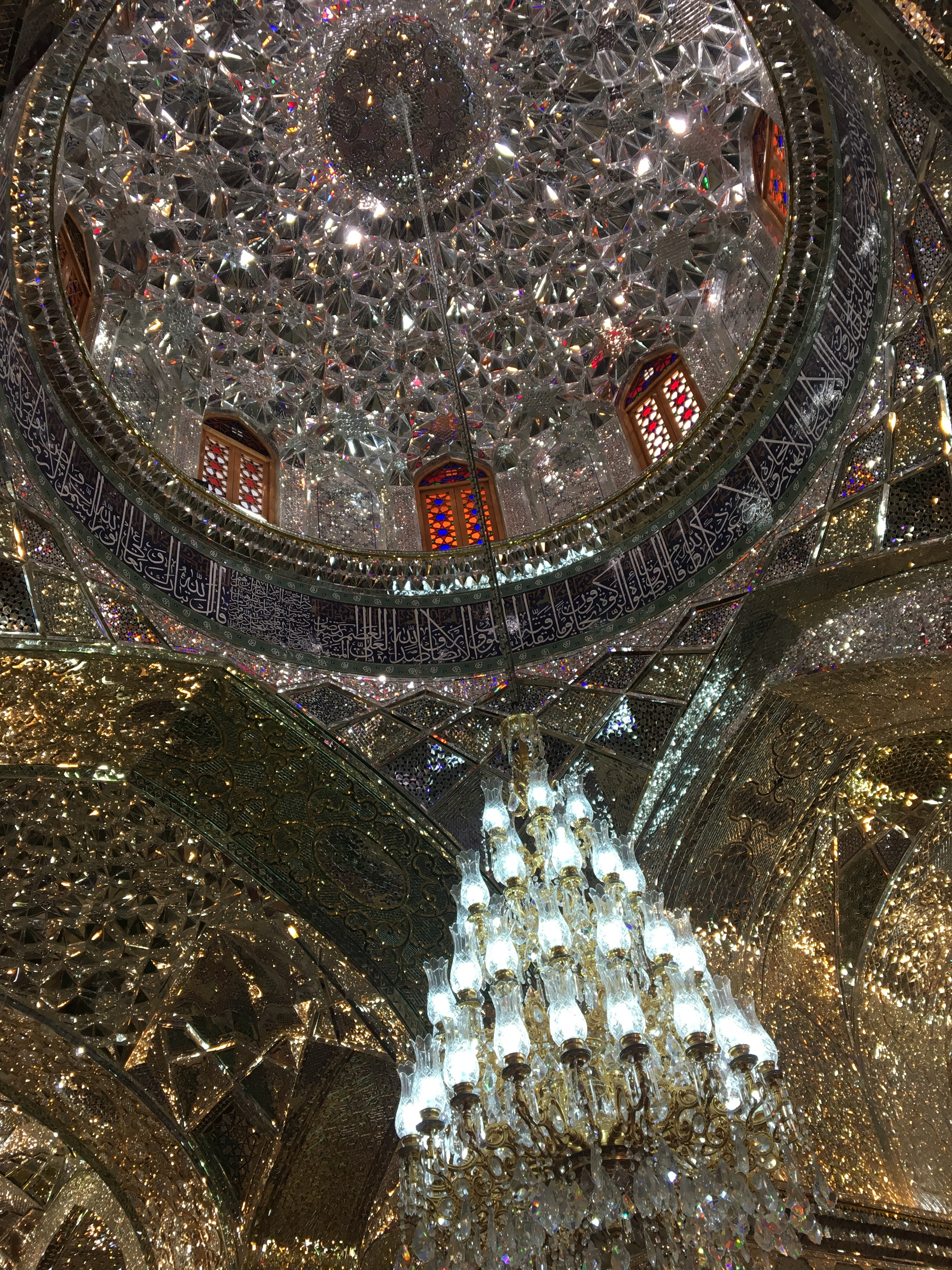
Ayeneh-kari on the ceiling of Shah Cheragh shrine, Shiraz

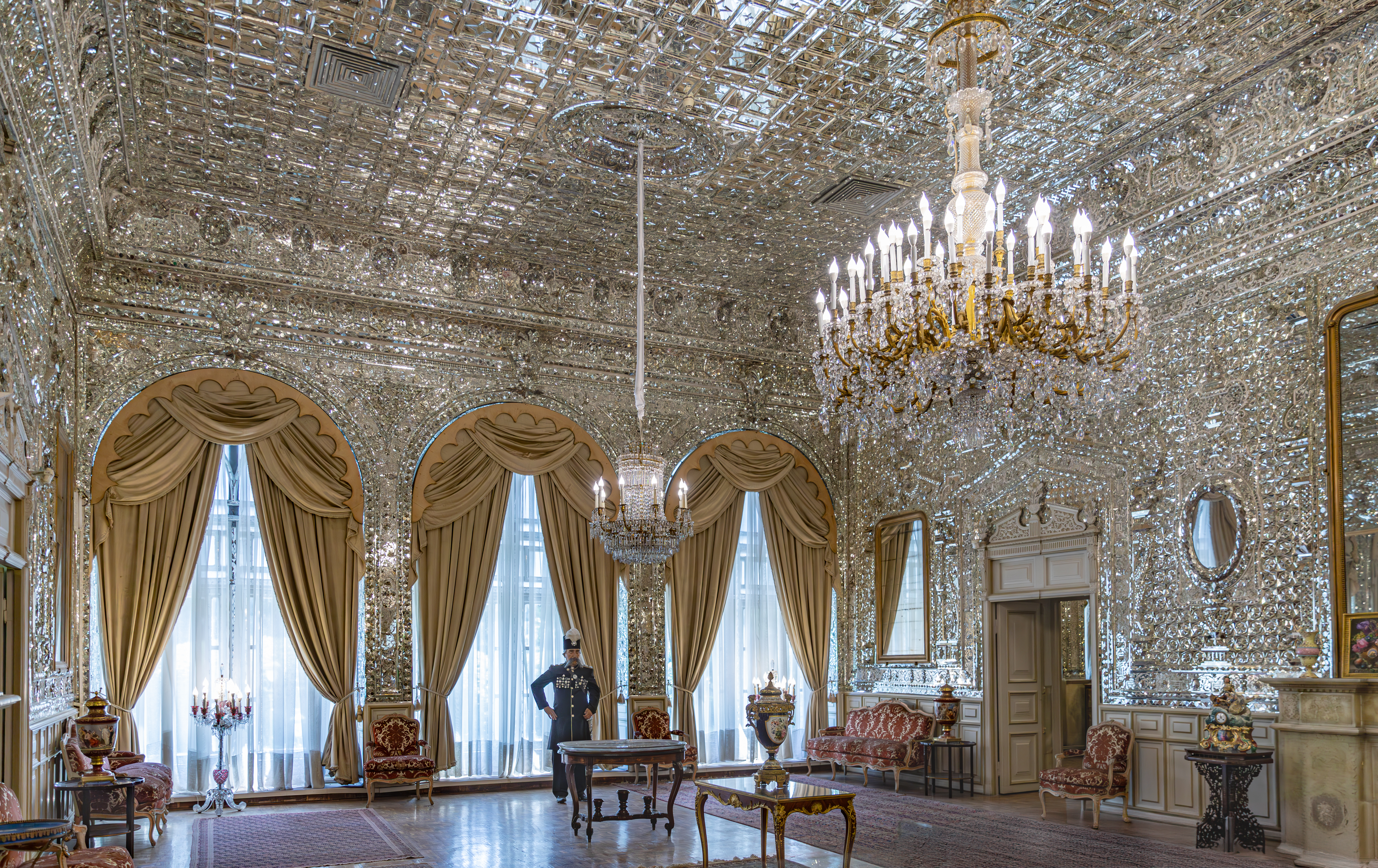
Ayeneh-kari in the Brilliant Hall of Golestan Palace, Tehran

=== Cinema ===
With 300 international awards in the past 25 years, films from Iran continue to be celebrated worldwide. Notable directors include Abbas Kiarostami, Mohsen Makhmalbaf, and Majid Majidi.

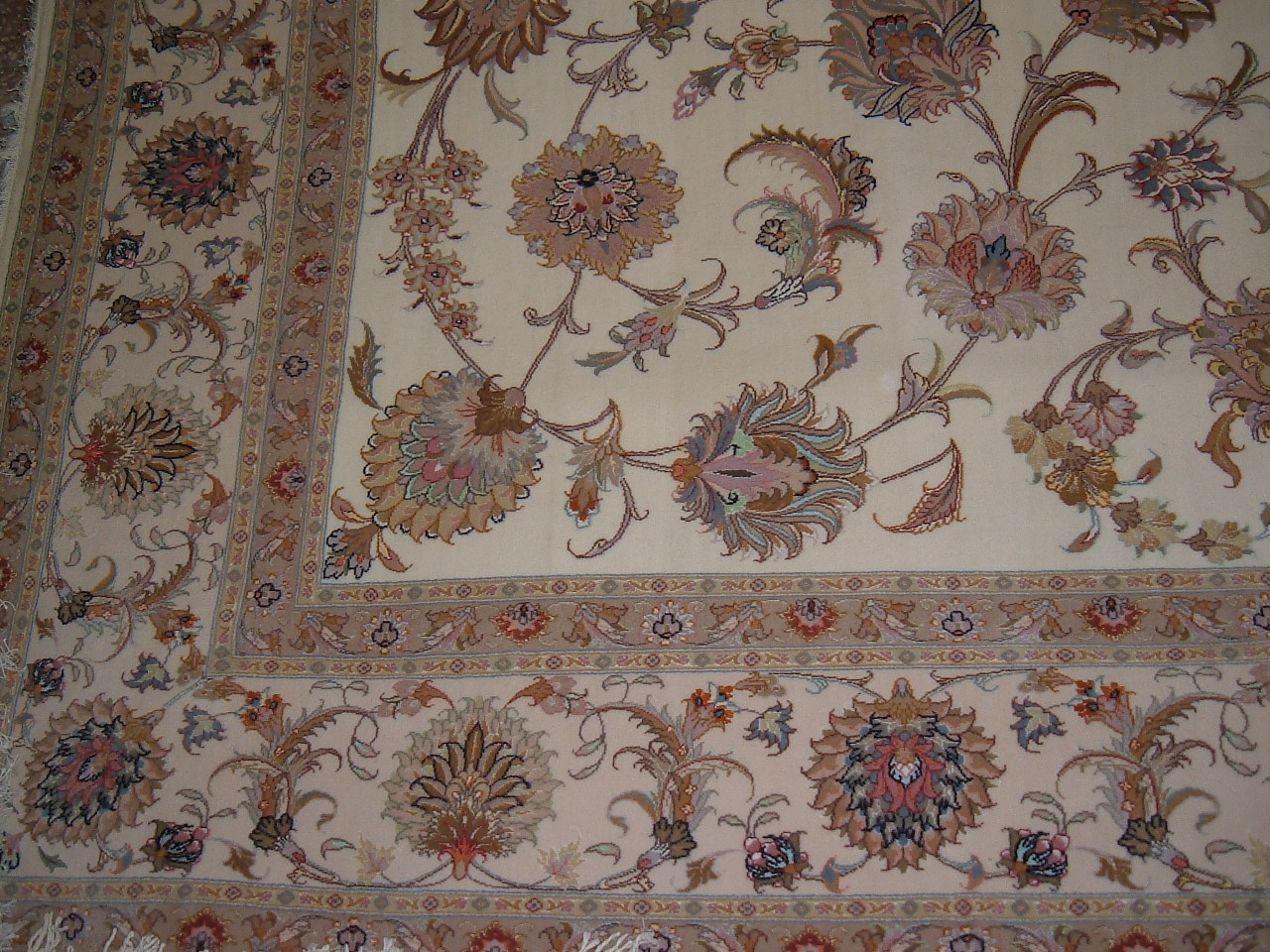
A sample of Tabriz rugs

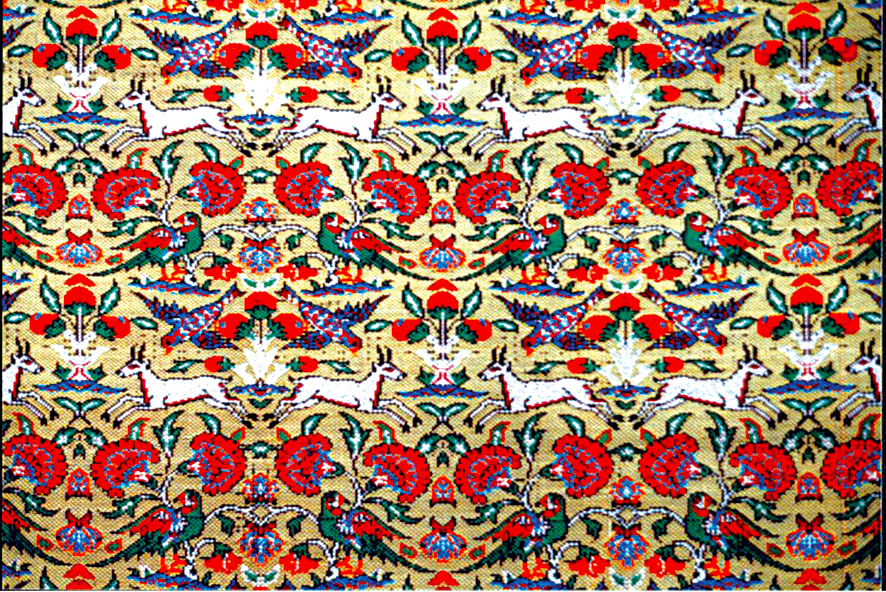
Persian Silk Brocade. Persian Textile (The Golden Yarns of Zari - Brocade). Silk Brocade with Golden Thread (Golabetoon)

=== Metalwork (Ghalam-zani) ===
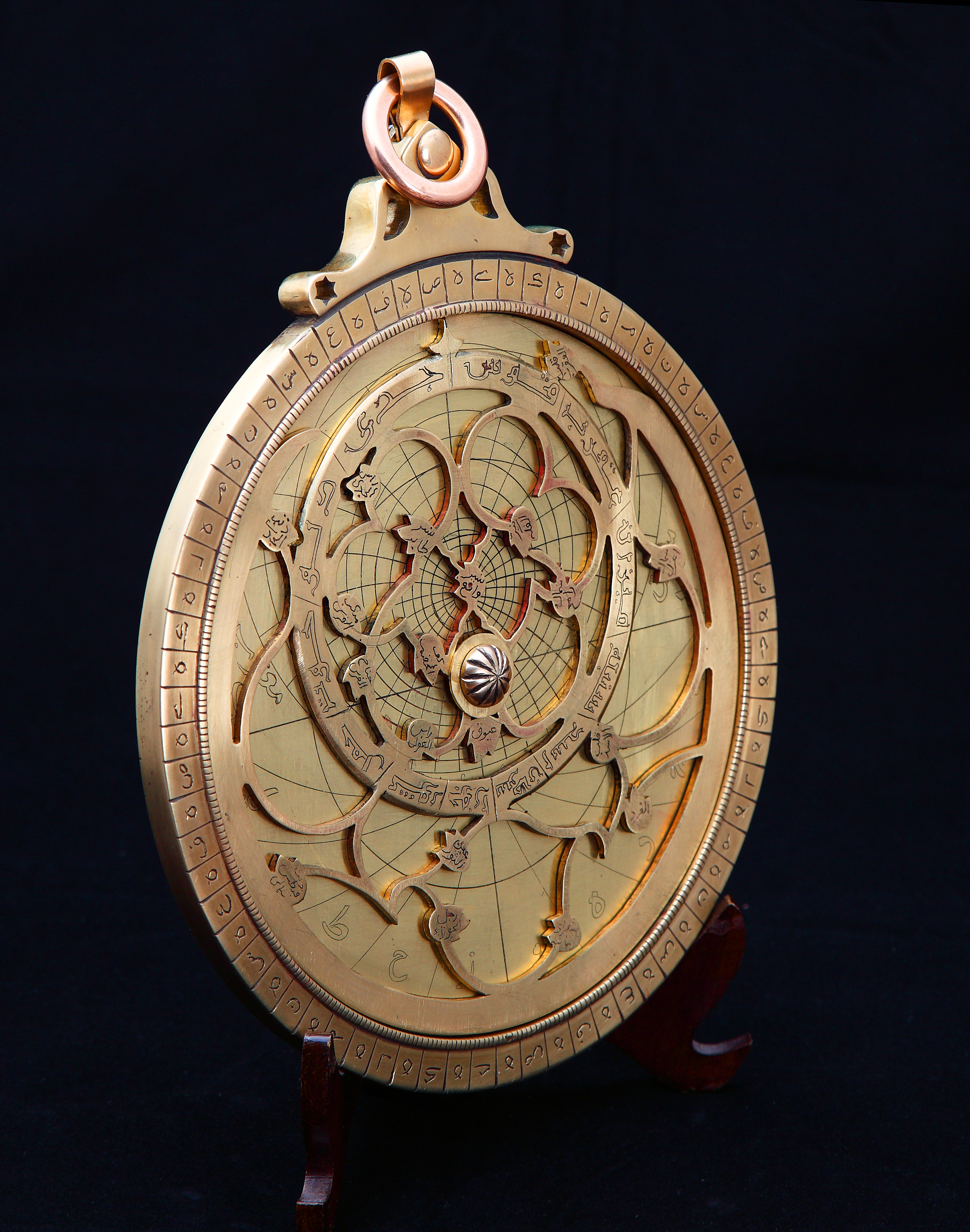
Iranian new Astrolabe

Luristan bronzes, estimated to be from around 1000-650 BCE, are a distinctive group of small objects decorated with figures of animals and human in inventive and vigorous poses.

==== Khatam-kari ====
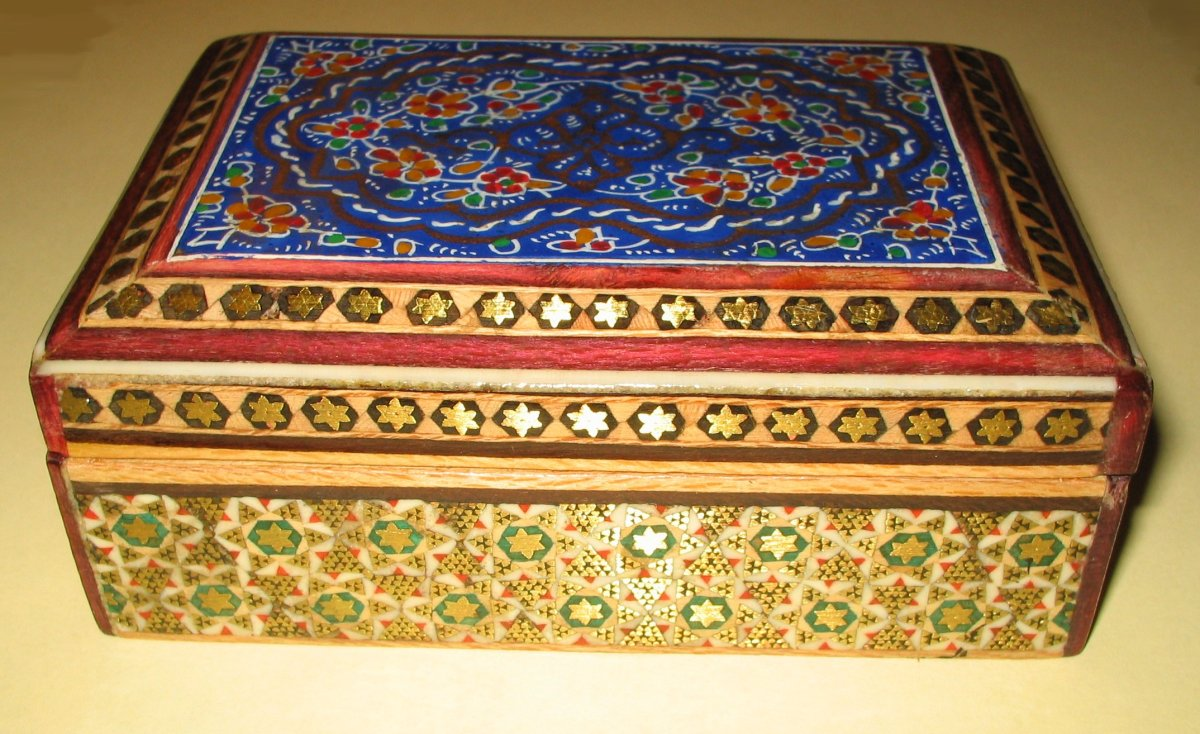
An example of "khatam-kari"

Marquetry technique appeared since the Safavid period: at this time, khatam was so popular in the court that princes learned this technique at the same level of music or painting. In the 18th and 19th centuries, khatam declined, before being stimulated under the reign of Reza Shah, with the creation of craft schools in Tehran, Isfahan, and Shiraz. "Khatam" means "incrustation", and "Khatam-kari" (Persian: خاتم‌کاری), "incrustation work". This craft consists in the production of incrustation patterns (generally star shaped), with thin sticks of wood (ebony, teak, ziziphus, orange, rose), brass (for golden parts), camel bones (white parts). Ivory, gold or silver can also be used for collection objects. Sticks are assembled in triangular beams, themselves assembled and glued in a strict order to create a cylinder, 70 cm in diameter, whose cross-section is the main motif: a six-branch star included in a hexagon. These cylinders are cut into shorter cylinders, and then compressed and dried between two wooden plates, before being sliced for the last time, in 1 mm wide tranches. These sections are ready to be plated and glued on the object to be decorated, before lacquer finishing. The tranche can also be softened through heating in order to wrap around objects. Many objects can be decorated in this fashion, such as: jeweler/decorative boxes, chessboards, cadres, pipes, desks, frames or some musical instruments. Khatam can be used on Persian miniature.

Coming from techniques imported from China and improved by Persian know-how, this craft existed for more than 700 years and is still perennial in Shiraz and Isfahan.

==== Mina-kari ====
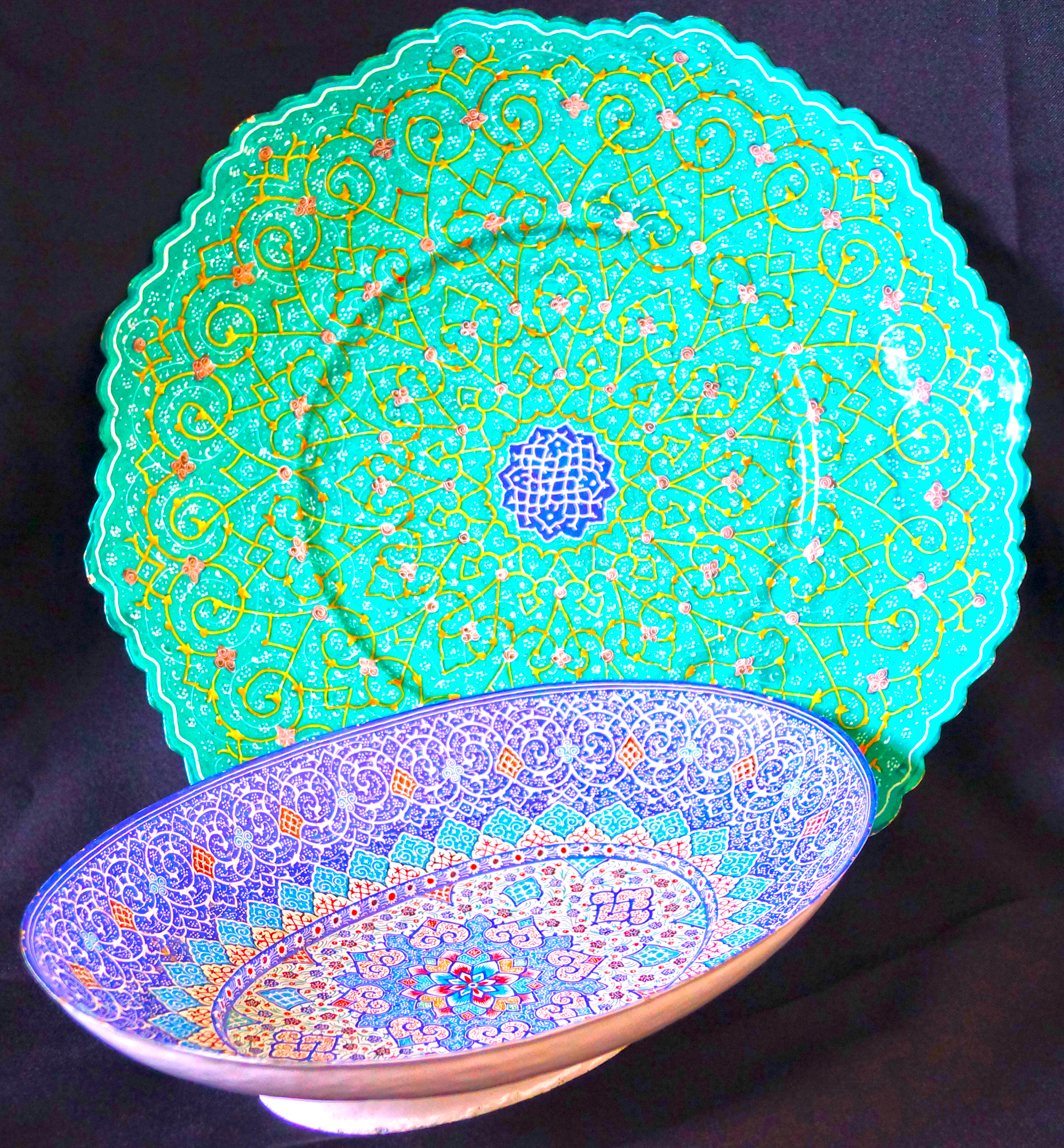
An example of Mīnākārī from Iran.

Enamel working and decorating metals with colorful and baked coats is one of the traditional art forms in Isfahan. Mina is defined as some sort of glasslike colored coat which can be stabilized by heat on different metals particularly copper. Although this course is of abundant use industrially for producing metal and hygienic dishes, it has been paid high attention by painters, goldsmiths and metal engravers since long times ago.

Internationally, it is categorized into three kinds as below:

1. Painting enamel
2. Charkhaneh or chess like enamel
3. Cavity enamel.

What of more availability in Isfahan is the painting enamel of which a few have remained in the museums of Iran and abroad indicating that Iranian artists have been interested in this art and used it in their metal works since the Achaemenian and the Sassanid dynasties. The enamels being so delicate, there are not many left from the ancient times. Some documents indicate that throughout the Islamic civilization of and during the Seljuk, Safavid and Zand dynasties there have been outstanding enameled dishes and materials. Most of the enameled dishes related to the past belong to the Qajar dynasty between the years 1810–1890 AD. There have also remained some earrings, bangles, boxes, water pipe heads, vases, and golden dishes with paintings in blue and green colors from that time. Afterwards, fifty years of stagnation caused by the World War I and the social revolution followed. However, again the enamel red color, having been prepared, this art was fostered from the quantity and quality points of view through the attempts bestowed by Ostad Shokrollah Sani'e zadeh, the outstanding painter of Isfahan in 1935 and up to then for forty years.

Now after a few years of stagnation since 1992, this art has started to continue its briskness having a lot of distinguished artists working in this field. To prepare an enamelled dish, the following steps are used. First, choose the suitable dish by the needed size and shape which is usually made by a coppersmith. Then, it is bleached through enamelled working which is known as the first coat. It is then put into a seven hundred and fifty degree furnace. At this stage, the enamelled metal will be coated with better enamels a few more times and again reheated. The dish is then ready to be painted. The Isfahanian artists, having been inspired by their traditional plans as arabesque, khataii (flowers and birds) and using fireproof paints and special brushes, have made painting of Isfahan monuments such as step, the enamelled material is put into the furnace again and heated at five hundred degrees. This causes the enamelled painting to be stabilized on the undercoat, creating a special shining effect. Most of today's enamel workings are performed on dishes, vases, boxes and frames in various size.

=== Relief and sculpture ===
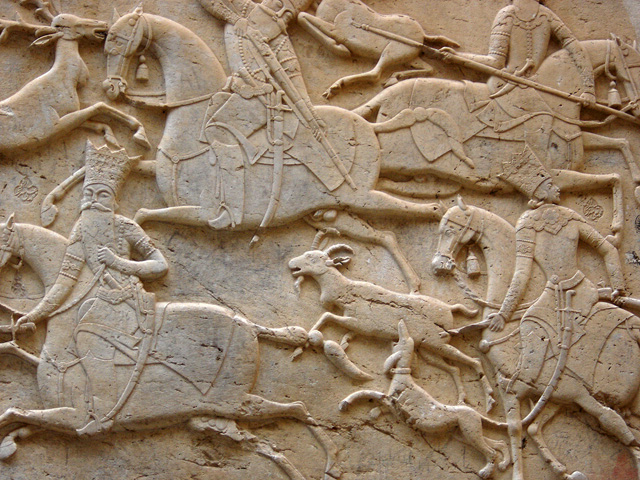
The Qajarid reliefs of Tangeh Savashi were made by order of Fath Ali Shah.

Relief carving has a history dating back thousands of years, especially in rock reliefs. Elamite reliefs are still to be found in Iran with Persepolis being a mecca of relief creations of antiquity.

=== Other handicrafts ===
- Galesh
- Giveh
- Iranian Termeh
- Persian Jewels
- Kalamkari

== See also ==
- Azerbaijani art
- Culture of Iran
- Cultural Heritage, Handcrafts and Tourism Organization
- Graffiti in Tehran
- International rankings of Iran
- Iran's House of Art
- Iranian modern and contemporary art
- List of Persian painters
- Persian theatre
- Qajar art
- Safavid art

== Gallery ==
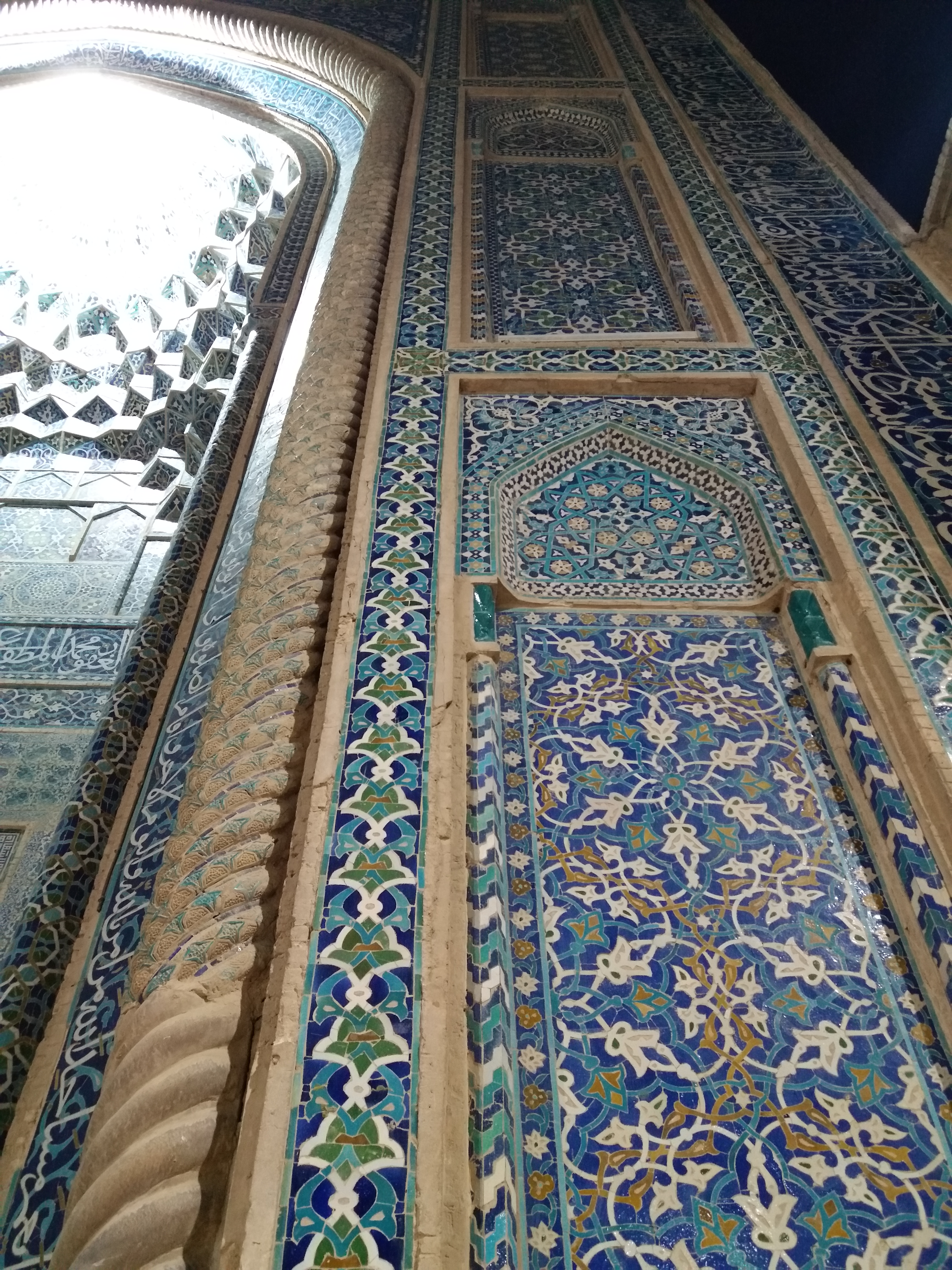
Iranian Architecture, Jameh Mosque of Kerman

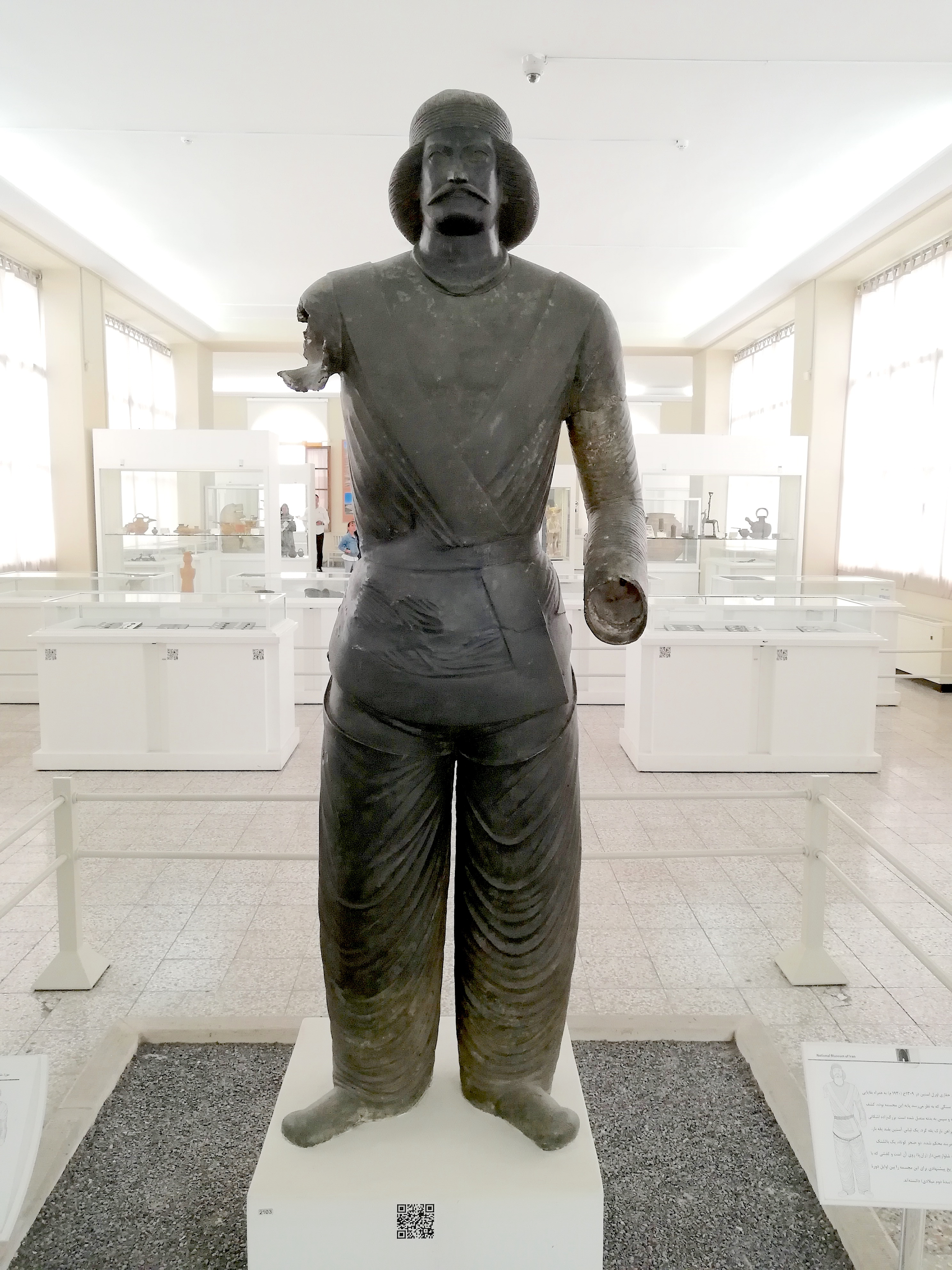
Parthian Man Statue, National museum of Iran

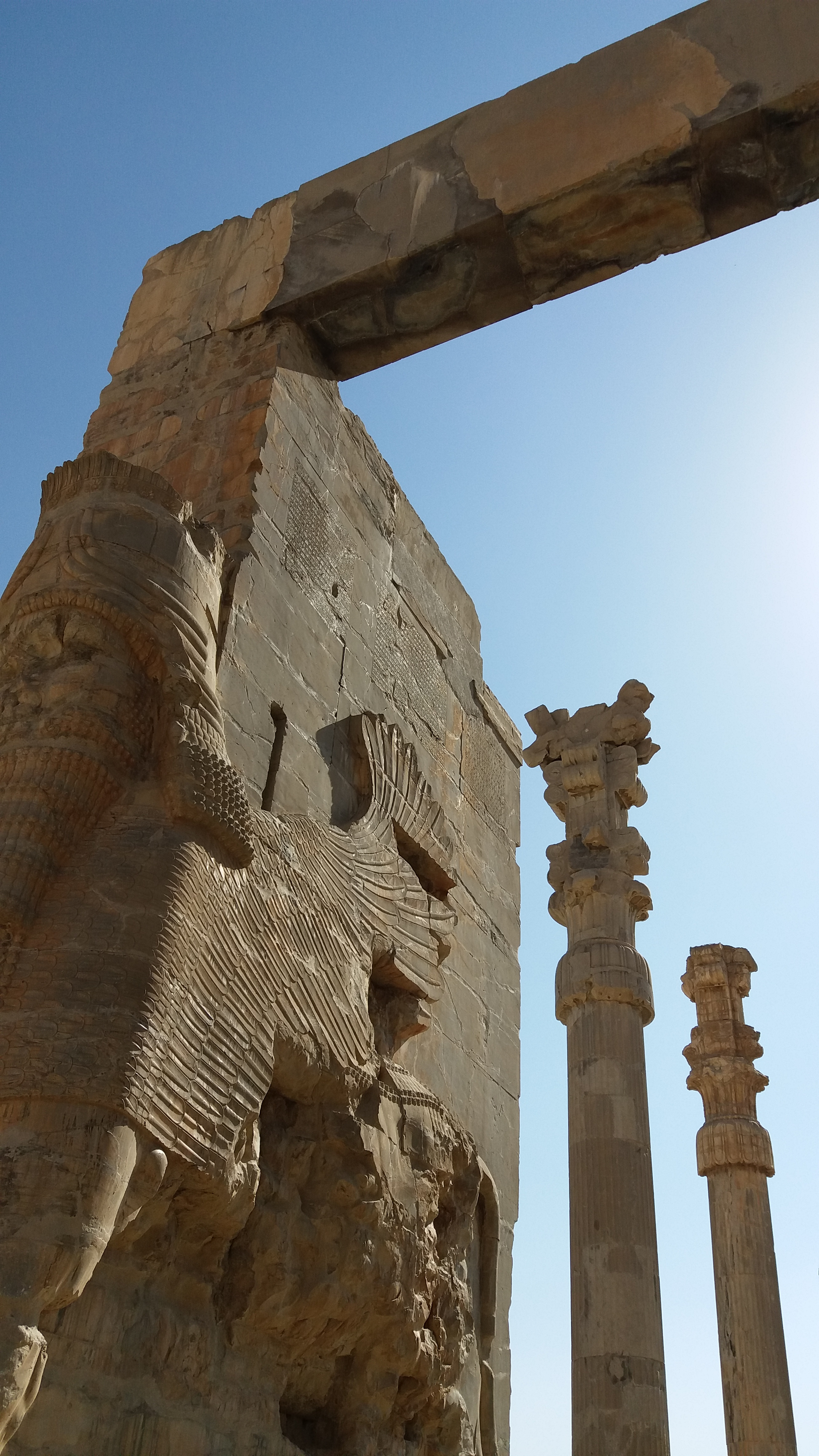
Achaemenid Architecture

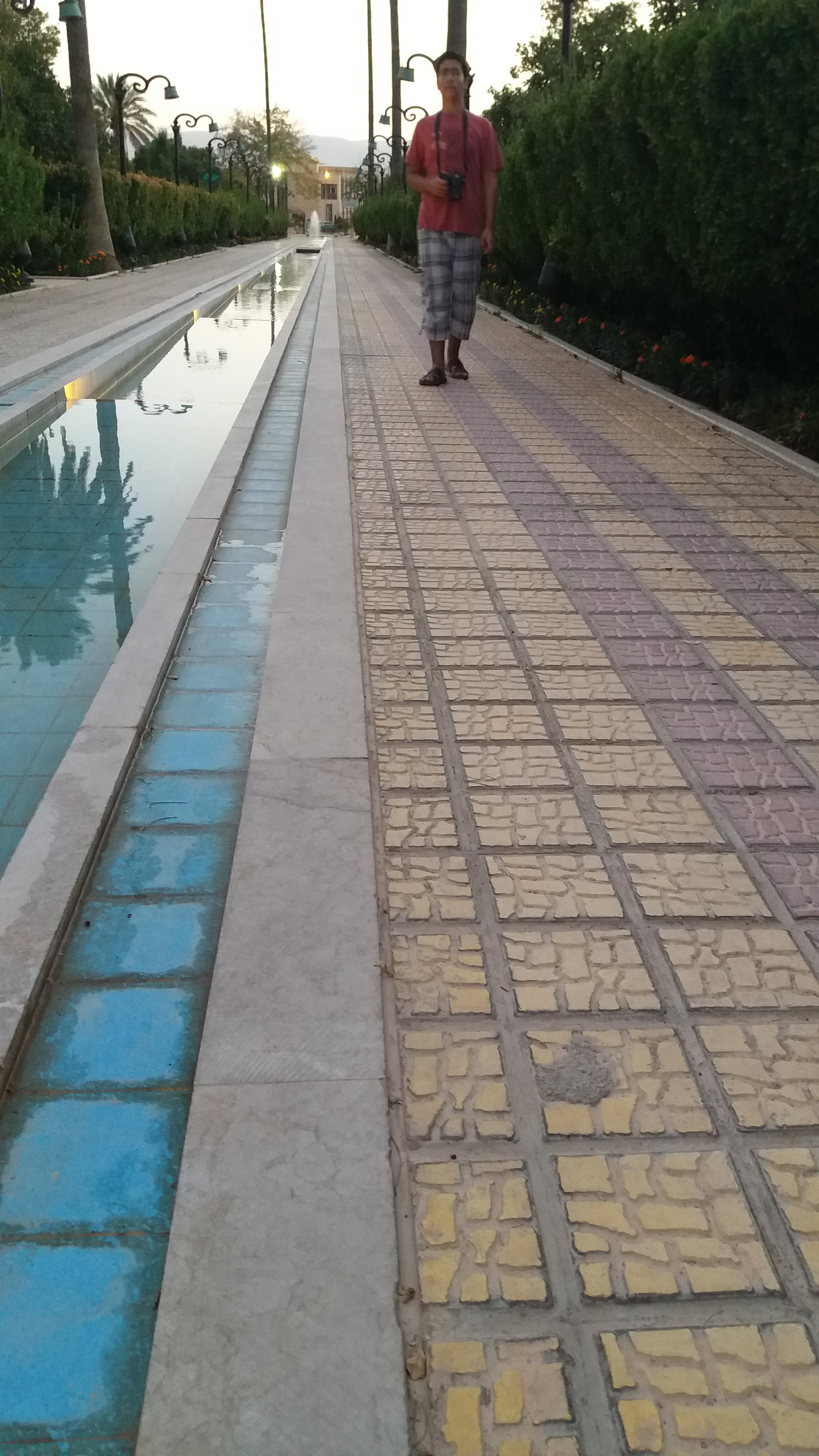
Persian gardens, Delgoshah Garden

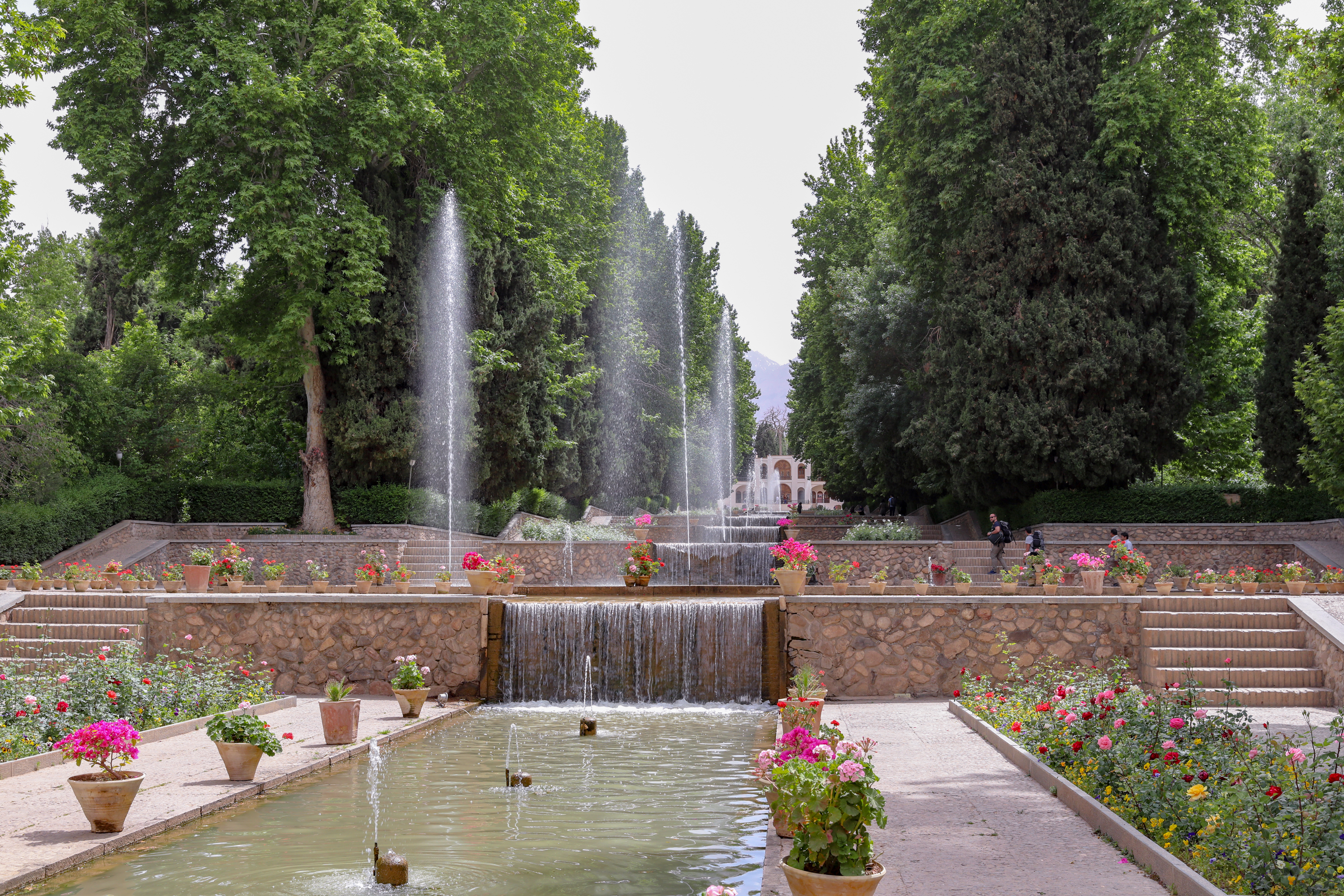
Persian Gardens, Shazdeh Garden

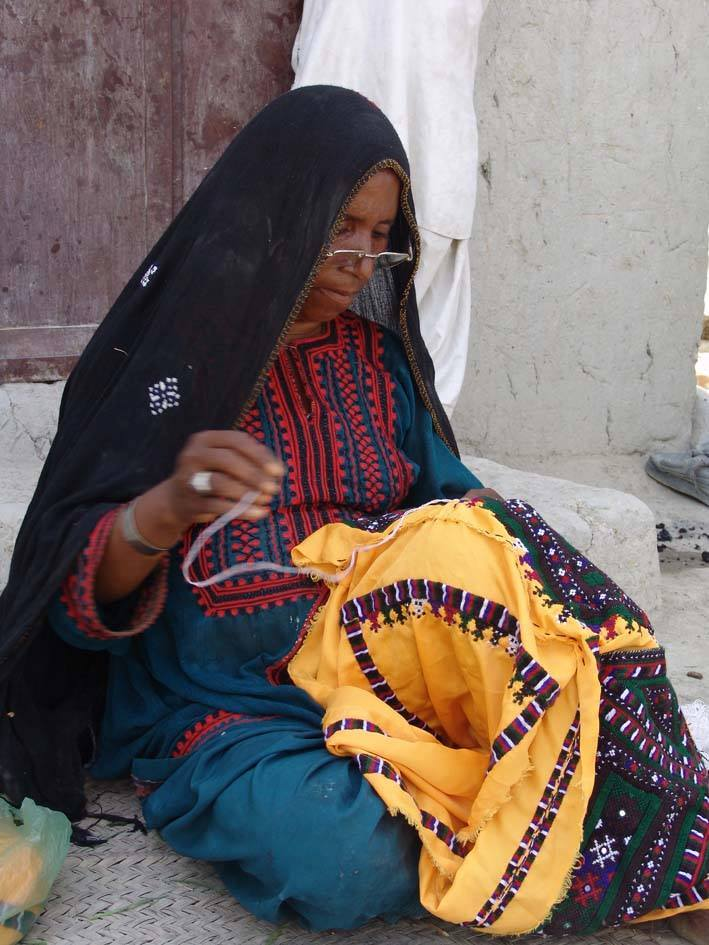
Suzan Doozi

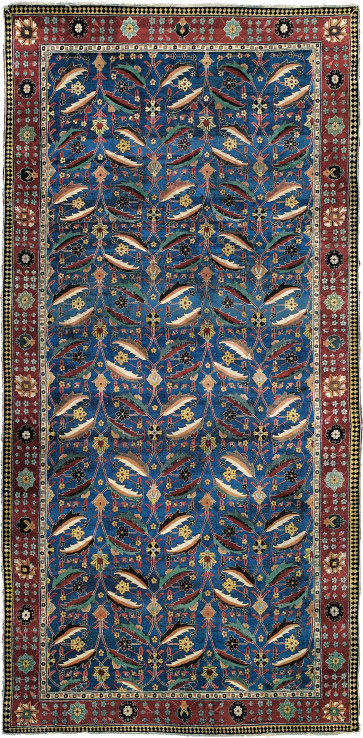
Kerman Carpet

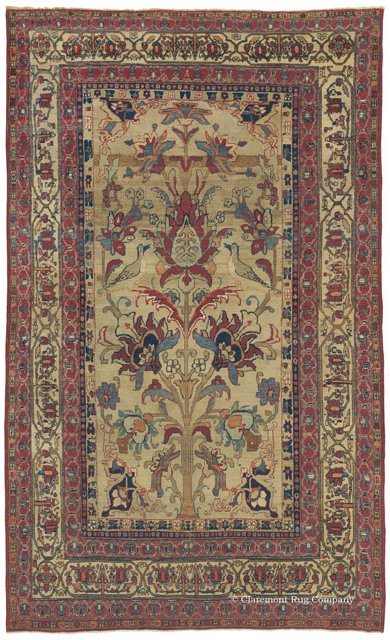
Carpet

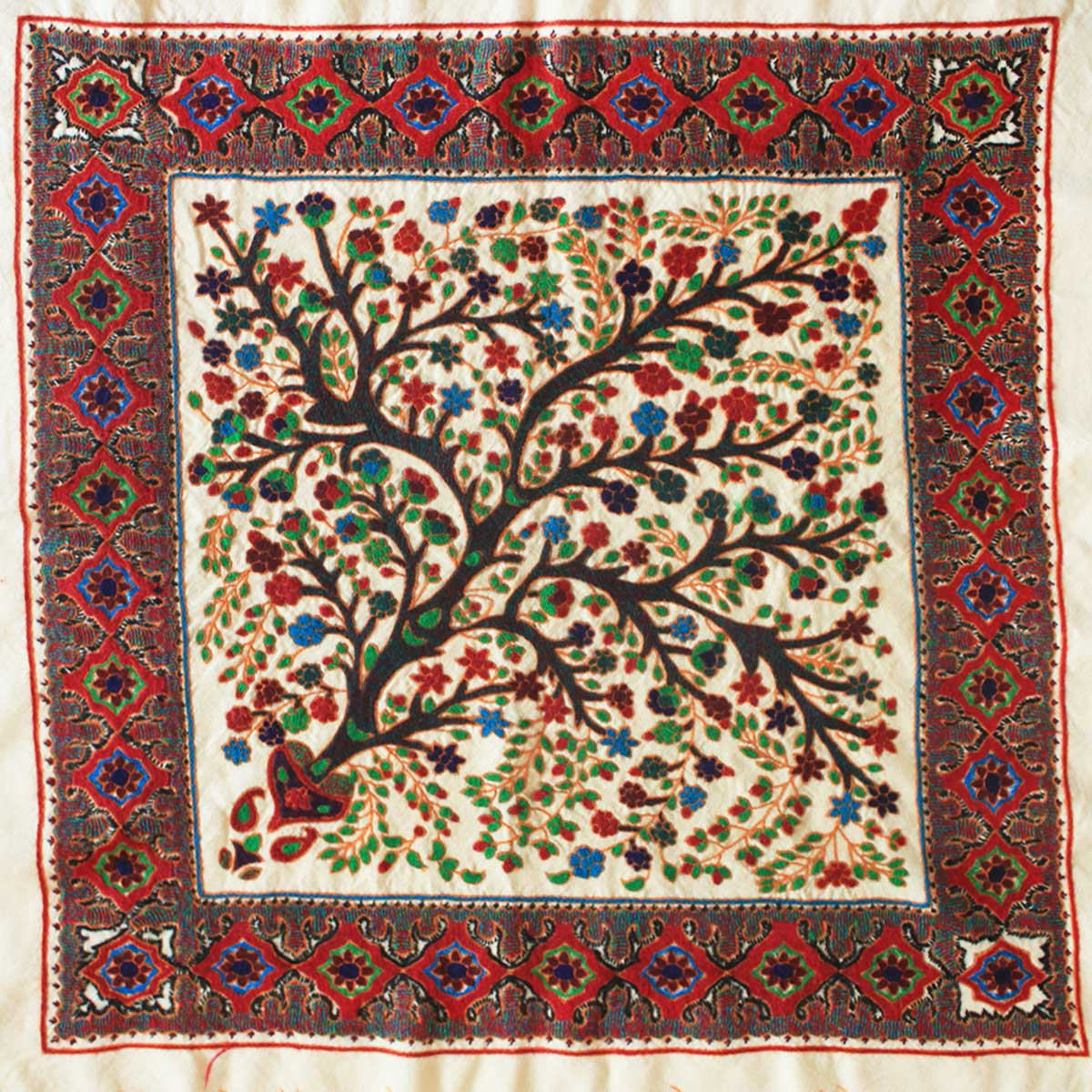
Pateh, Kerman

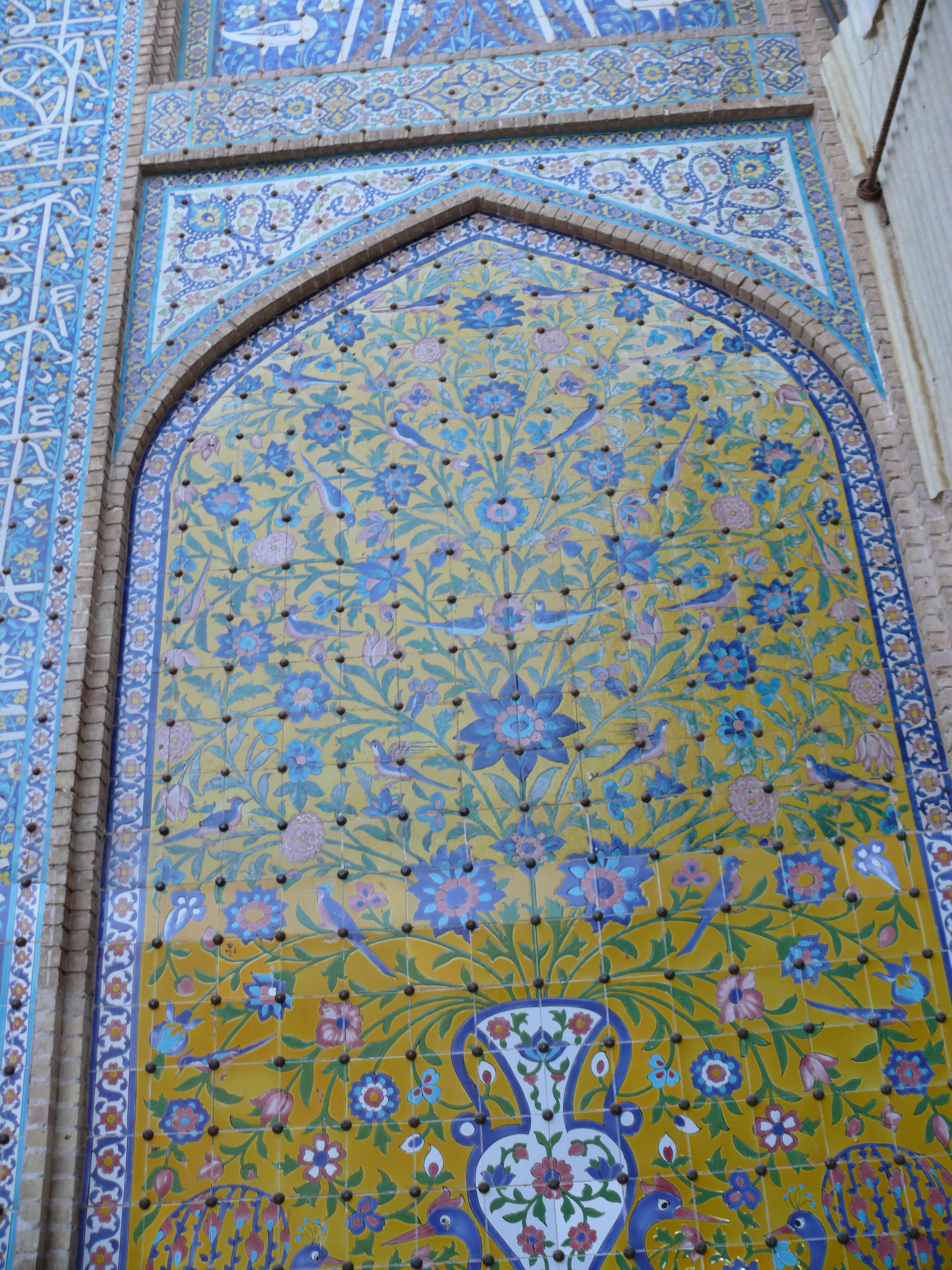
Tiles, Ibrahim Khan Complex, Kerman

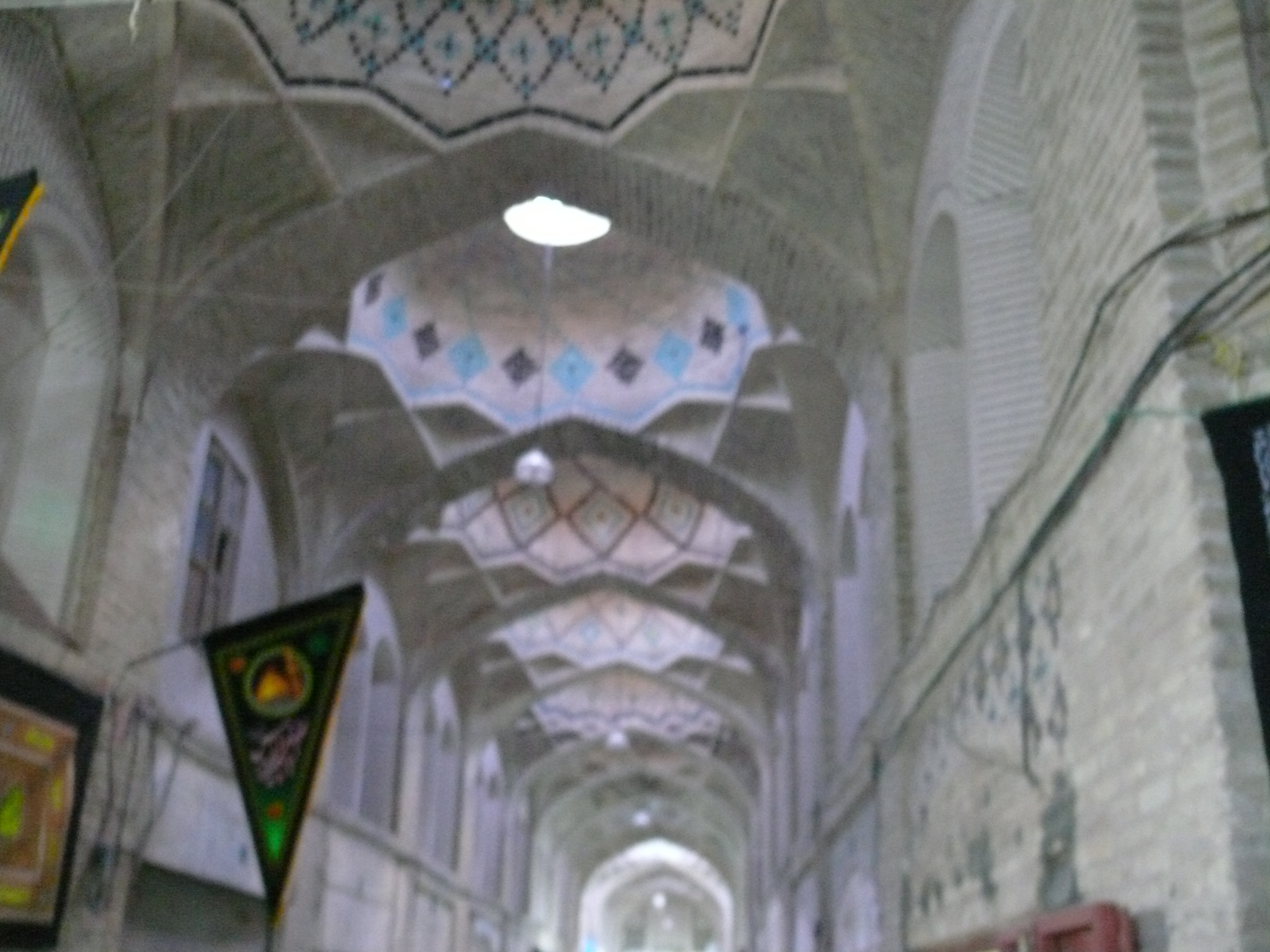
Sardar Bazar, Kerman

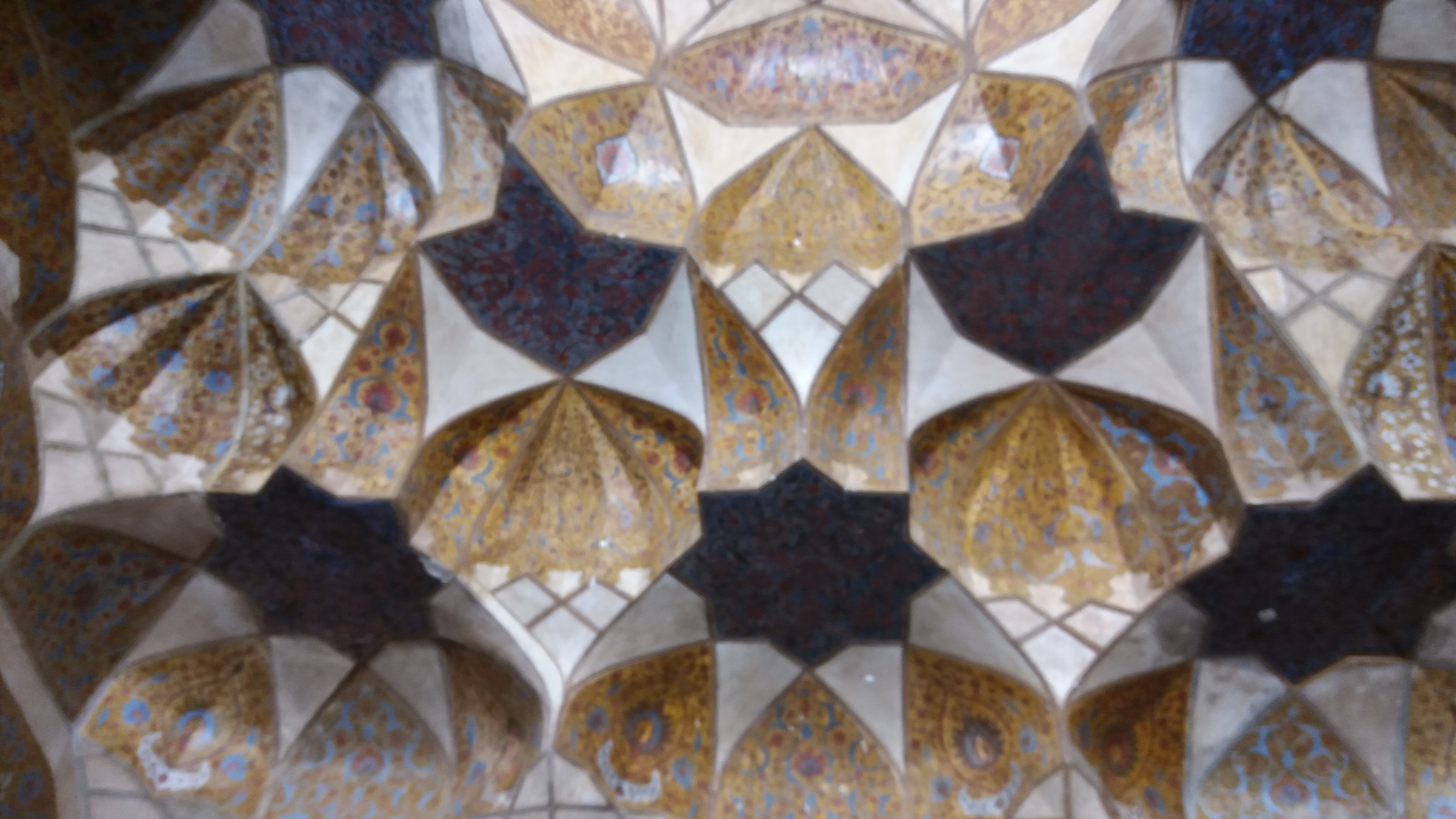
Ganjali Khan Complex, Kerman

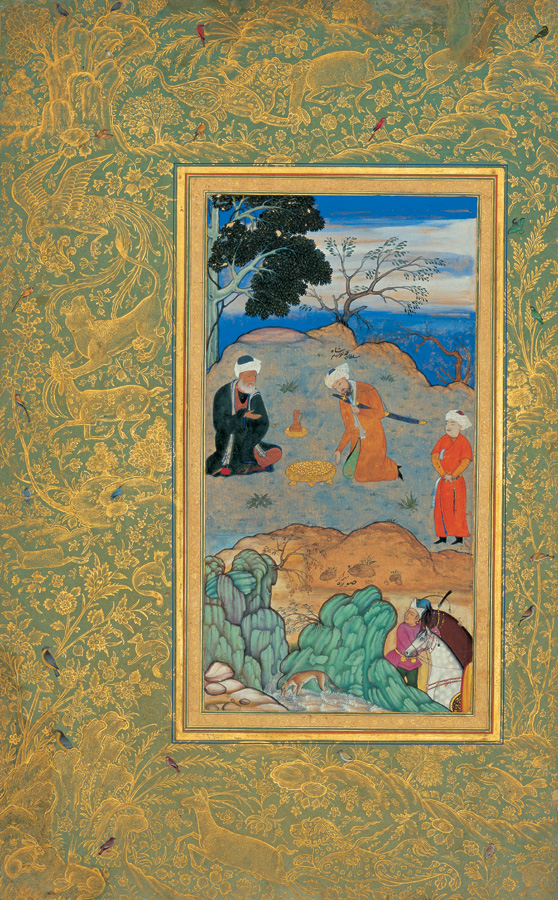
Painting, Kamāl ud-Dīn Behzād
