= Iran Film Foundation =

UK charity

The Iran Film Foundation
- Formation: 2014
- Type: Foundation, Nonprofit Organization
- Headquarters: London, United Kingdom
- Chairman: Manoucher Shahabi
- Website: iranfilmfoundation.org

The Iran Film Foundation is a non-political UK unregistered charity with a mission to promote and preserve the cinematic history of the Persian speaking world. The remit of the Foundation is specific and is only related to cinematic history, television history and the moving image. The Foundation covers the late nineteenth century to the present day.

The Foundation achieves its objectives by organising and supporting lectures, cultural events and conferences, for archivists, and by supporting publications and museum programs.

The Foundation is funded by contributions from trustees and patrons and by various fund-raising events. The Foundation does not accept financial support from any Government, Semi-Government organisations or lobbying groups.

The IFF is governed by a body of trustees supported by a Film and Moving Image Committee, university academics in the United States, United Kingdom and European Union.

In 2024, the foundation opened up a new online website to allow general submissions in digital format.

== History ==
The organizers of the Foundation have contributed to the Iranian film industry during the past ten years prior to the formal founding of group.

In 2015, members of the moving image committee contributed to the Berlin Film Festival with supporting the distribution of Iranian cinematography through access deals.

In 2017, the foundation was referenced in movie events in Tehran independent film festival held in London in 2017.

== See also ==
- Iranian studies
- Culture of Iran
- International rankings of Iran
- Iran's House of Art
- Iranian modern and contemporary art
- List of Iranian films
- Fajr International Film Festival
- London Iranian Film Festival
- Bāgh-e Ferdows, Film Museum of Iran
- Persian Film
