= London Iranian Film Festival =

- Location: London, England
- Festival date: 18–26 November
- Language: English and Persian
- Website: www.ukiff.org.uk

London Iranian Film Festival is an annual, independent film festival held in London. It is the only festival in the UK that is dedicated to Iranian independent cinema.

The London Iranian Film Festival is organised by a non-political, film-focused organization UKIFF, which aims to provide a platform for Iranian cinema in the UK. The Festival showcases films that consistently explore Iranian culture and identity.

Submissions to the festival are looked over by a panel of filmmakers and film industry professionals, and the films selected for screening are then placed into four categories: Short film, Documentary, Animation and Feature film. Prizes are awarded to the best film from each category on the closing night of the festival.

Previous selection committees have included Iranian filmmaker and scriptwriter Kambuzia Partovi, screen director Patrick Tucker, cinematographer Zoran Veljkovic, and Iranian filmmaker Mojtaba Mirtahmasb.

The film festival has also had assistance from members of Europe's only dedicated Iranian cinematic organization Iran film foundation, as well as members of Britain's Iranian community.
