= Delgosha Garden =

Historic garden in Shiraz, Iran

Coordinates: 29.6197°N 52.5751°E

- باغ دلگشا
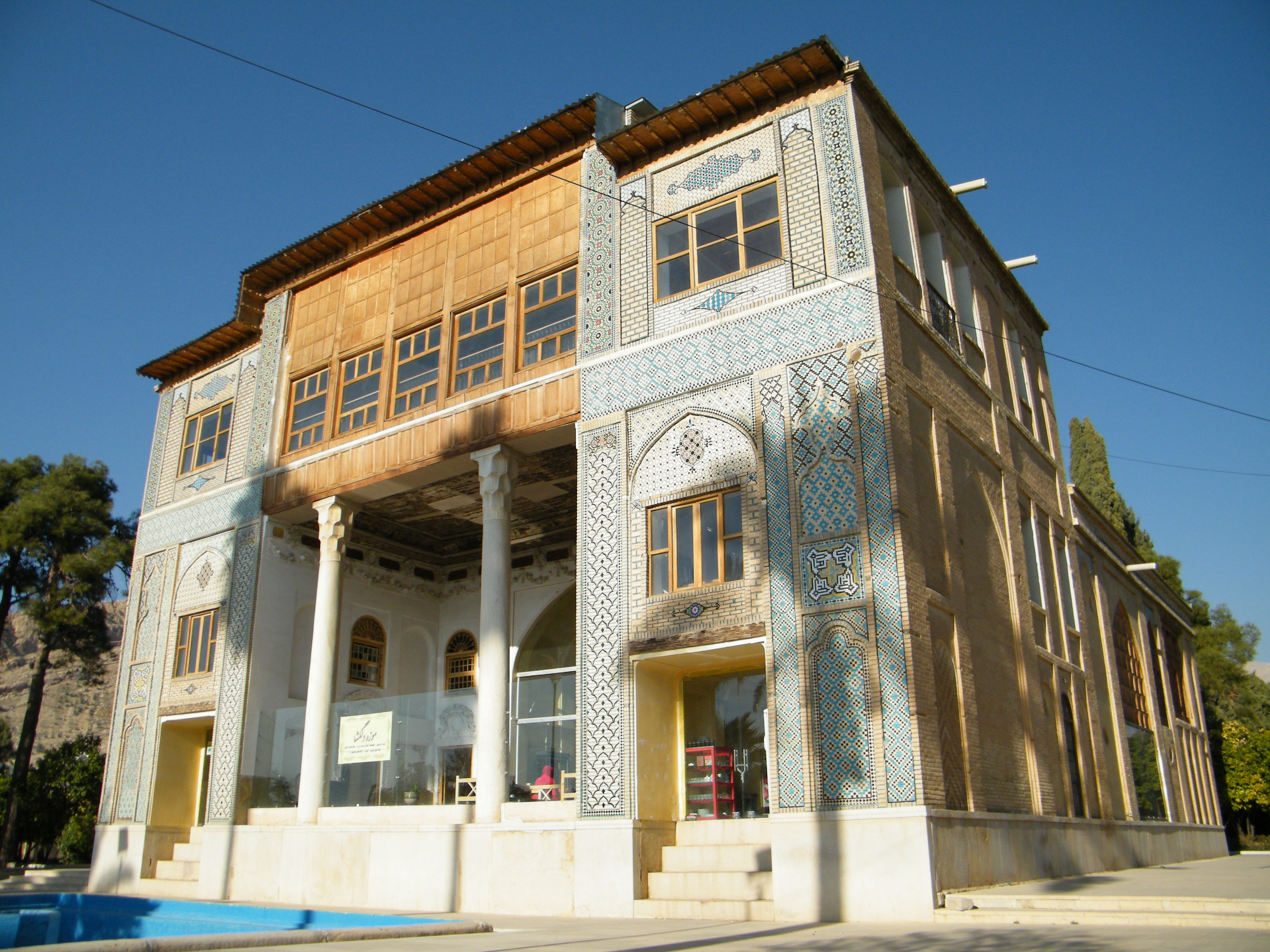
- Interactive map of the Delgosha Garden area

General information
- Location: Shiraz, Iran

Delgosha Garden (Persian: باغ دلگشا, romanized: Bagh-e Delgosha) is a historic garden near the Tomb of Saadi in Shiraz, Iran. It belongs to the pre-Islamic Sasanian era.

During the 18th century, between the reign of Nader Shah and the rise of the Zand dynasty, it suffered a lot of damage and was subsequently rebuilt during the reign of Karim Khan Zand.

The water that flows from the aqueduct spring of Saadi's tomb passes through this garden.

Delgosha Garden is located in the northeastern part of Shiraz, on the southern side of Tang Ab Khan, at the foot of a mountain.

== Gallery ==
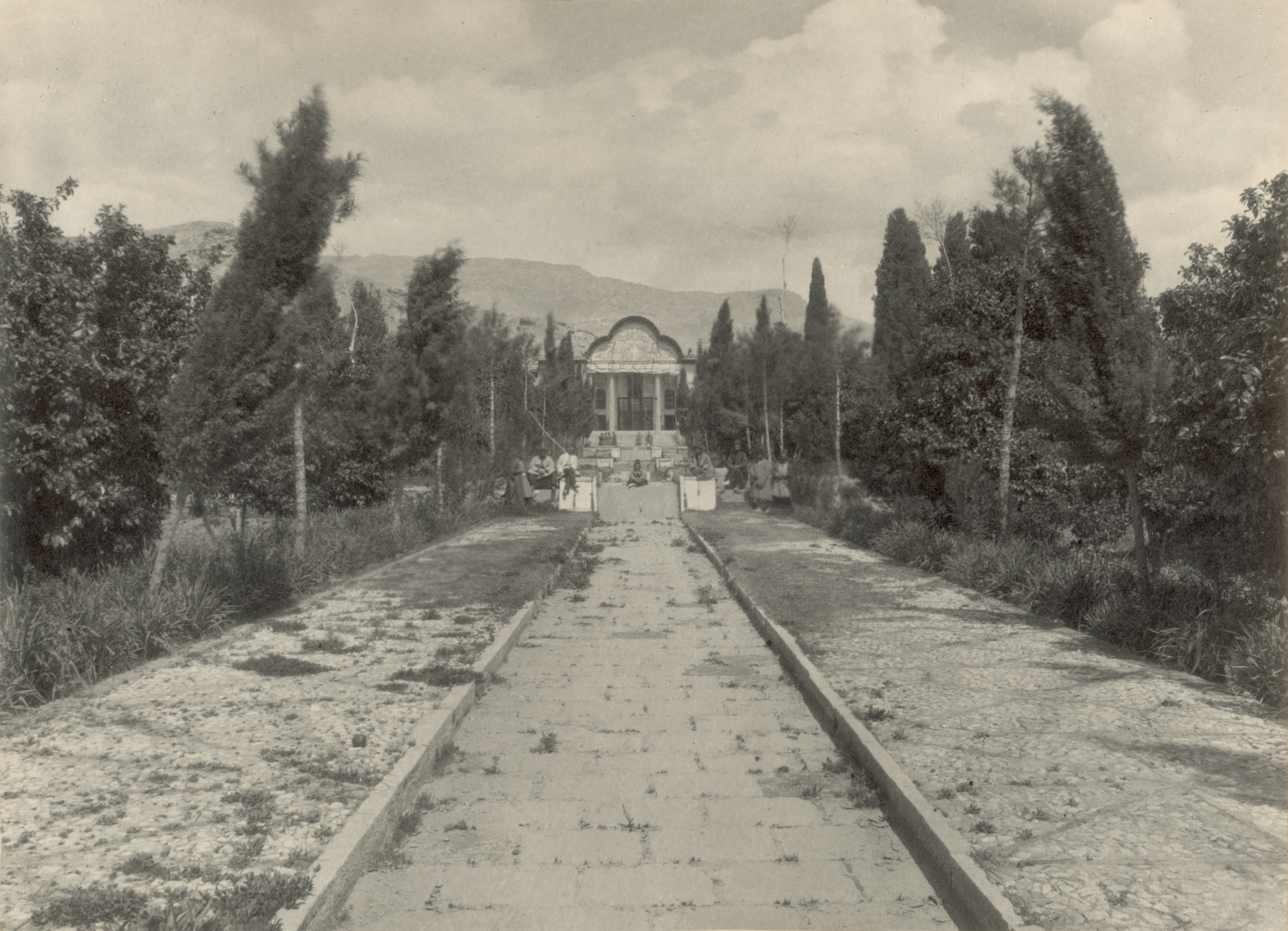
The garden in the late 19th century

The garden from above

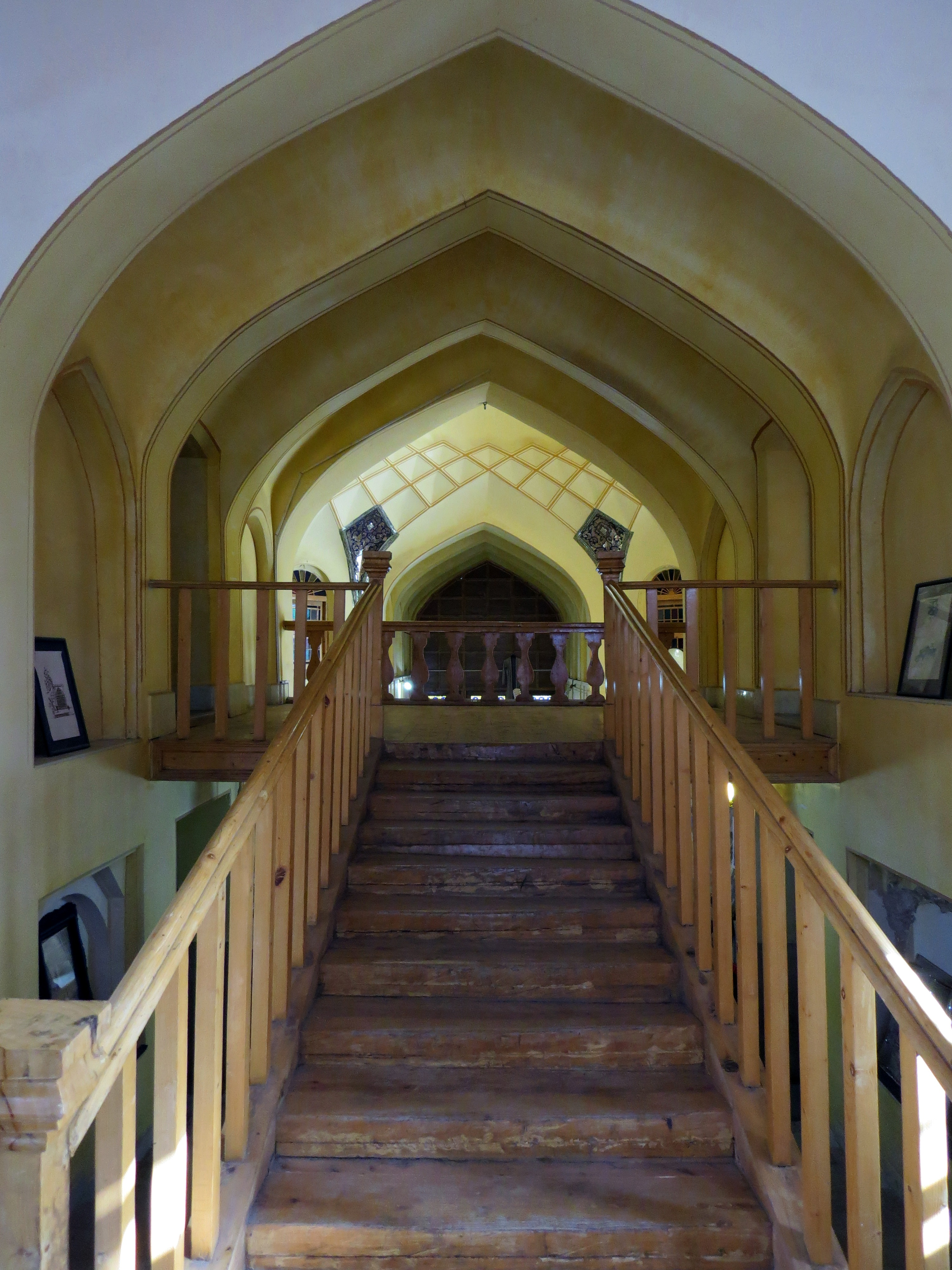
The interior of the mansion

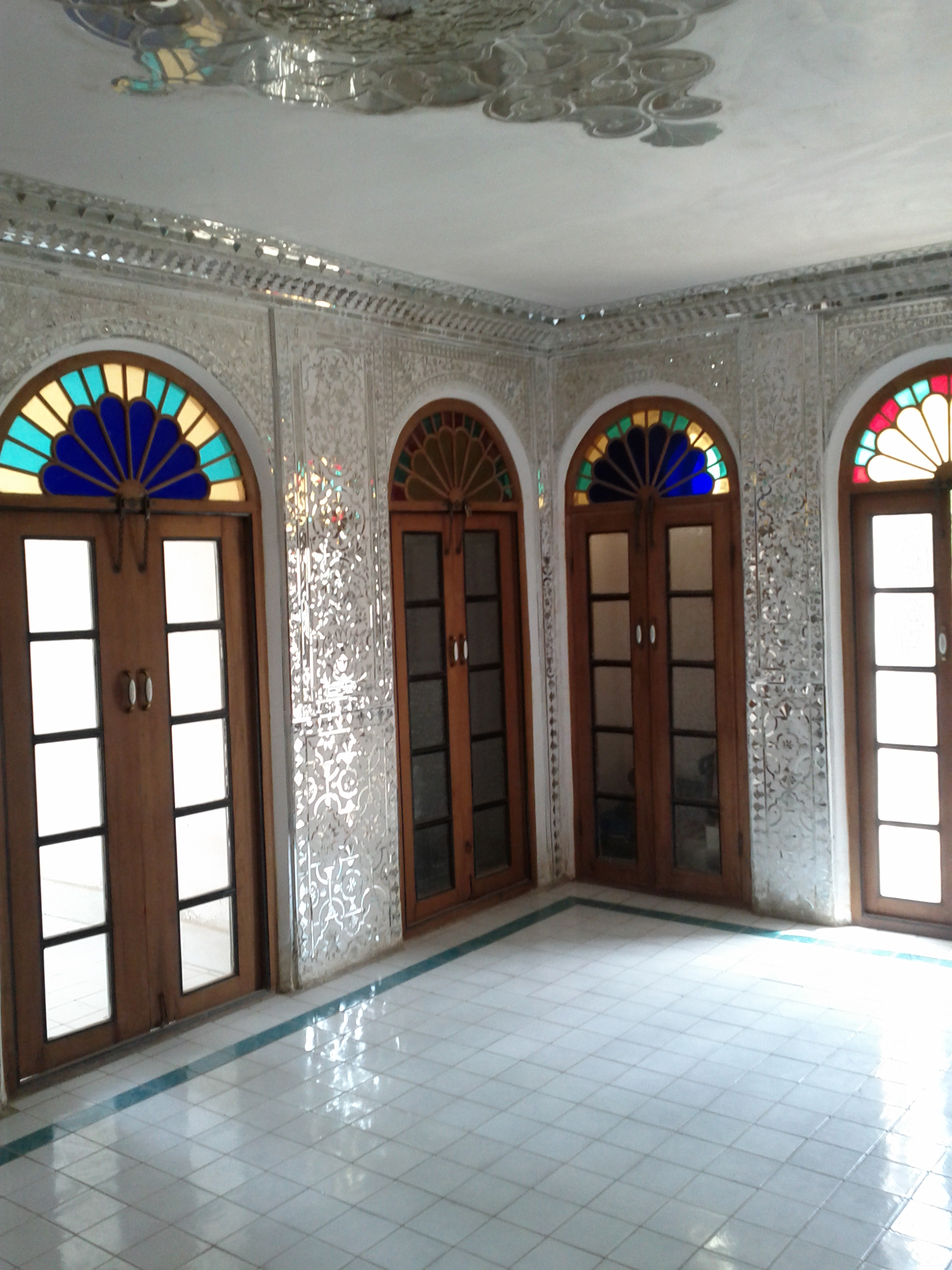
Ayeneh-kari in the interior of the mansion
