= Galesh =

Persian form of footwear

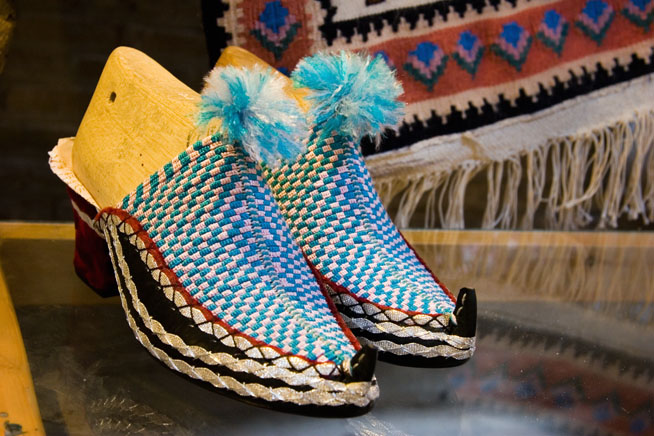
A traditional galesh

A kalash' or galesh (Persian: گالش) is a traditional footwear of Iran. Unlike most galoshes, the "galesh" are always handwoven and with specific fabrics. It is what people in Persia used to wear before the proliferation of the modern shoe, especially in the provinces of northern Iran. Galesh are still made today, but in the category of handicrafts and cultural produce.

Galesh are also called khussa or charoq. In India a similar footwear is called mojari or jutti.

== See also ==
- Persian art
- Giveh
- List of shoe styles
