= Giveh =

Handmade shoe of Iran

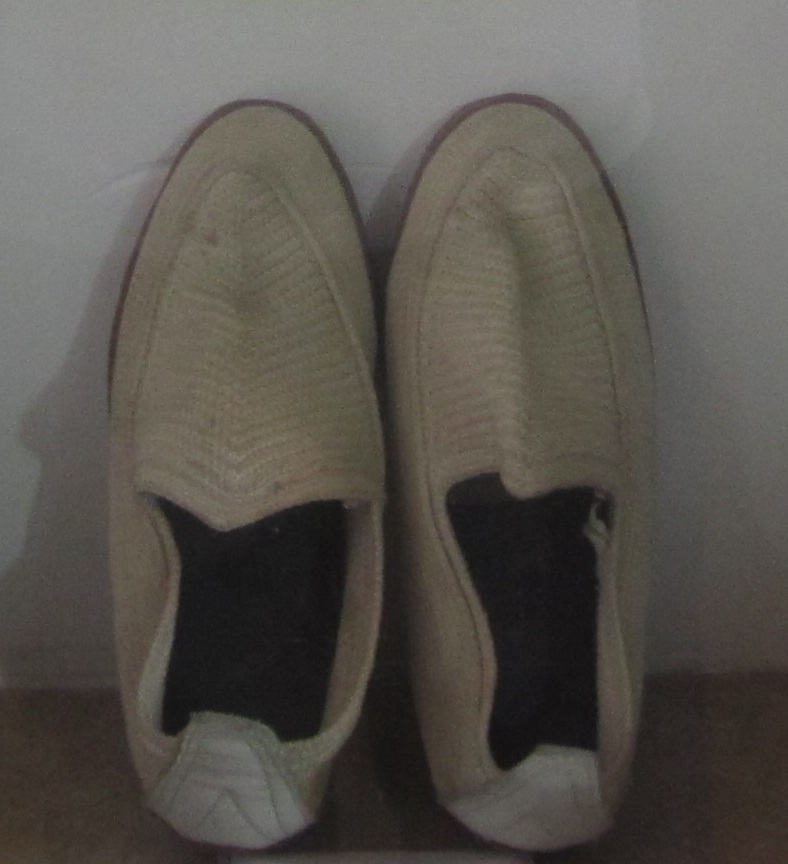
A pair of giveh

Giveh or Giwah (Persian: گیوه) is a kind of handmade shoe that is common in several parts of Iran especially in rural and mountainous areas of Kermanshah Province. The production centers of Giveh are the provinces of Yazd and Kermanshah and Arak in Iran. Marivan in particular is particular is famous in Iran as the centre of Kalash production and Senejan is popular for Ajideh production, the latter type received a UNESCO symbol too.

Giveh is made up of two parts: sole and upper. The sole is usually made of rubber or leather and the upper is made of fabric created using an ancient technique known as nalbinding (not weaving) that pre-dates knitting or crochet. Before the arrival of the rubber industry to the area, Giveh-makers would use a kind of wild-bull leather to make giveh and the upper was made of wool or cotton nalbound fabric. Most rich people would wear them. Since the arrival of the rubber industry, lower-class people have used rubber as the sole of their givehs.

== See also ==
- List of shoe styles
- Galesh
- Nalbinding
- Espadrille
