= Persian Jewels =

Iran (formally Persia) possesses an extraordinary treasure of royal jewelry, including a copious amount of mother-of-pearl from the Persian Gulf. The Iranian crown jewels are among the largest, most dazzling and valuable jewel collection in the world. The jewels are displayed in the vaults of the Central Bank of Iran in Tehran, and are one of the most appealing tourist attractions in Iran.

Akik is also exported from Iran to various countries including the Indian subcontinent.

== See also ==
- Iranian Crown Jewels - world's largest jewel collection
- Pahlavi Crown
- Kooh-i-noor, a jewel formerly in Persian possession, is part of the British crown jewels
