= Iran's House of Art =

American non-profit organization

logo

Iran's House of Art is a University of Minnesota-affiliated non-profit organization dedicated to improving the public's understanding of Iran by arranging for art exhibitions, film screenings, lectures and concerts by Iranian musicians. The organization was established in the 2007–08 academic year, and has held a number of events at the university, beginning with "Merge: Harmony of Mystic Words".
