= Weaving =

Technology for the production of textiles

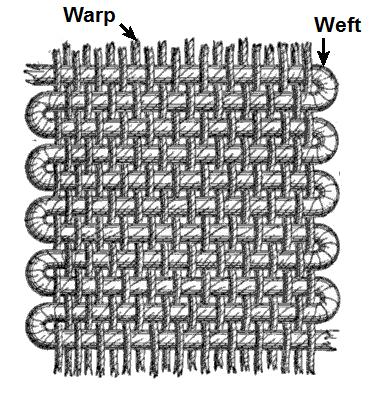
Warp and weft in plain weaving

Weaving is a method of textile production (Note: Other methods are knitting, crocheting, felting, and braiding or plaiting) in which two distinct sets of yarns or threads are interlaced at right angles to form a fabric or cloth. The longitudinal threads are called the warp and the lateral threads are the weft, woof, or filling. The method in which these threads are interwoven affects the characteristics of the cloth.

Cloth is usually woven on a loom, a device that holds warp threads in place while filling threads are woven through them. A fabric made of warp threads with a weft thread winding between can also be made using other methods, including tablet weaving, backstrap loom, or other techniques that can be done without looms.

The way the warp and filling threads interlace with each other is called the weave. The majority of woven products are created with one of three basic weaves: plain weave, satin weave, or twill weave. Woven cloth can be plain or classic (in one colour or a simple pattern), or can be woven in decorative or artistic design.

== Process and terminology ==
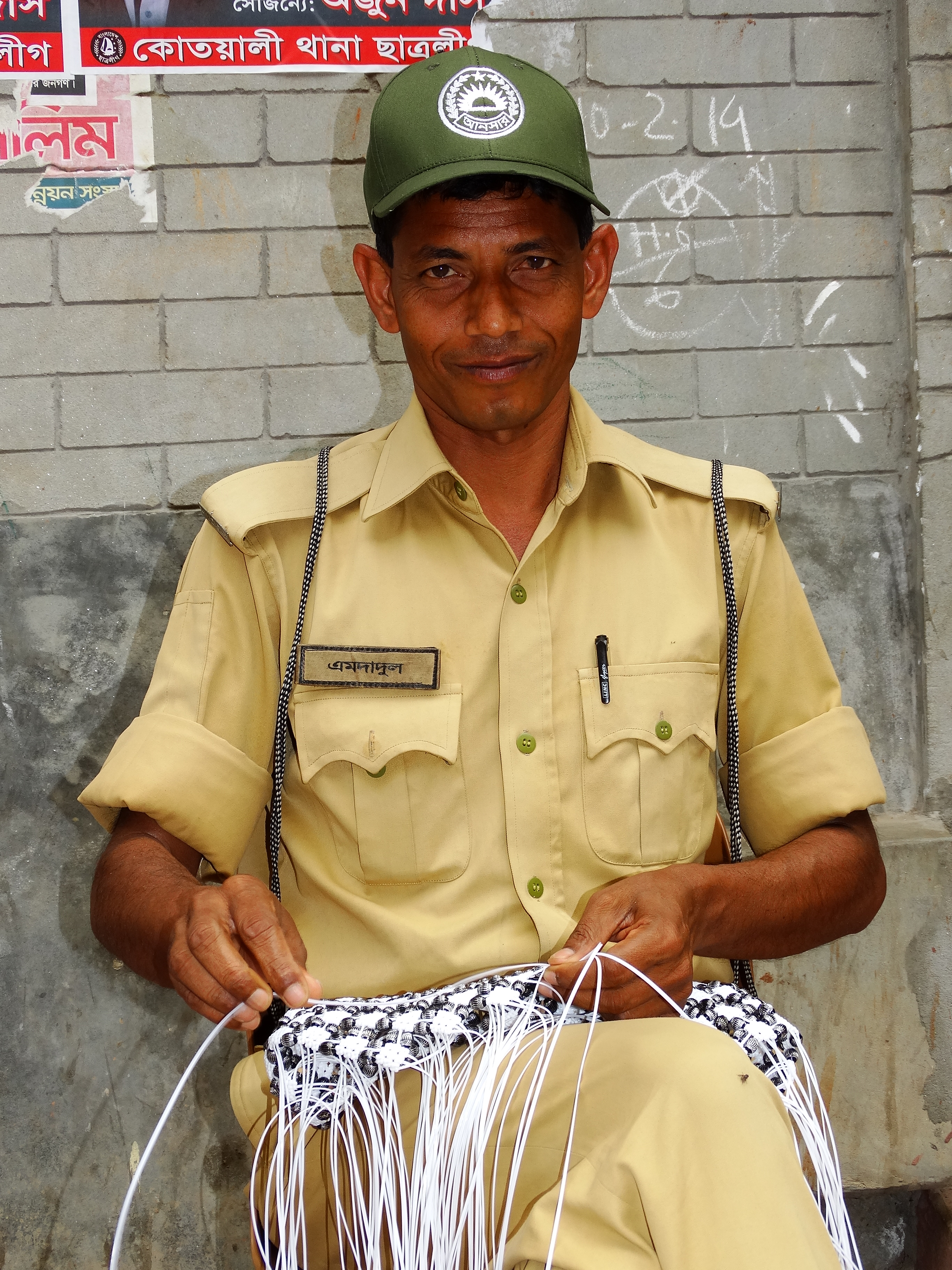
A Bangladesh Ansar officer weaving on duty

In general, weaving involves using a loom to interlace two sets of threads at right angles to each other: the warp which runs longitudinally and the weft (older woof) that crosses it. (Weft is an Old English word meaning "that which is woven"; compare leave and left. (Note: deriving from an obsolete past participle of weave (Oxford English Dictionary, see "weft" and "weave".)) One warp thread is called an end and one weft thread is called a pick. The warp threads are held taut and in parallel to each other, typically in a loom. There are many types of looms.

Weaving can be summarized as a repetition of these three actions, also called the primary motions of the loom.

- Shedding: where the warp threads (ends) are separated by raising or lowering heald frames (heddles) to form a clear space, referred to as the shed where the pick can pass
- Picking: where the weft or pick is propelled across the loom by hand, an air-jet, a rapier or a shuttle
- Beating-up or battening: where the weft is pushed up against the fell of the cloth by the reed

The warp is divided into two overlapping groups, or lines (most often adjacent threads belonging to the opposite group) that run in two planes, one above another, so the shuttle can be passed between them in a straight motion. Then, the upper group is lowered by the loom mechanism, and the lower group is raised (shedding), allowing the shuttle to pass in the opposite direction, also in a straight motion. Repeating these actions forms a fabric mesh but without beating-up, the final distance between the adjacent wefts would be irregular and far too large.

The secondary motions of the loom are the:

- Let off motion: where the warp is let off the warp beam at a regulated speed to make the filling even and of the required design
- Take up motion: takes up the woven fabric in a regulated manner so that the density of filling is maintained

The tertiary motions of the loom are the stop motions: to stop the loom in the event of a thread break. The two main stop motions are the

- Warp stop motion
- Weft stop motion

The principal parts of a loom are the frame, the warp-beam or weavers beam, the cloth-roll (apron bar), the heddles, and their mounting, the reed. The warp-beam is a wooden or metal cylinder on the back of the loom on which the warp is delivered. The threads of the warp extend in parallel order from the warp-beam to the front of the loom where they are attached to the cloth-roll. Each thread or group of threads of the warp passes through an opening (eye) in a heddle. The warp threads are separated by the heddles into two or more groups, each controlled and automatically drawn up and down by the motion of the heddles. In the case of small patterns the movement of the heddles is controlled by "cams" which move up the heddles by means of a frame called a harness; in larger patterns the heddles are controlled by a dobby mechanism, where the healds are raised according to pegs inserted into a revolving drum. Where a complex design is required, the healds are raised by harness cords attached to a Jacquard machine. Every time the harness (the heddles) moves up or down, an opening (shed) is made between the threads of warp, through which the pick is inserted. Traditionally the weft thread is inserted by a shuttle.

On a conventional loom, continuous weft thread is carried on a bobbin or pirn, in a shuttle that passes through the shed. A handloom weaver could propel the shuttle by throwing it from side to side with the aid of a picking stick. The "picking" on a power loom is done by rapidly hitting the shuttle from each side using an overpick or underpick mechanism controlled by cams 80–250 times a minute. When a pirn is depleted, it is ejected from the shuttle and replaced with the next pirn held in a battery attached to the loom. Multiple shuttle boxes allow more than one shuttle to be used. Each can carry a different colour which allows banding across the loom.

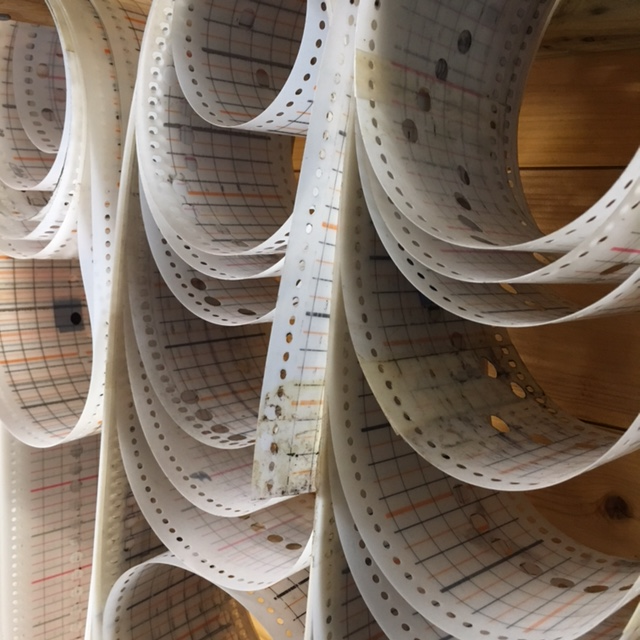
Weaving pattern cards used by Skye Weavers, Isle of Skye, Scotland

The rapier-type weaving machines do not have shuttles, they propel cut lengths of weft by means of small grippers or rapiers that pick up the filling thread and carry it halfway across the loom where another rapier picks it up and pulls it the rest of the way. Some carry the filling yarns across the loom at rates in excess of 2,000 metres per minute. Manufacturers such as Picanol have reduced the mechanical adjustments to a minimum, and control all the functions through a computer with a graphical user interface. Other types use compressed air to insert the pick. They are all fast, versatile and quiet.

The warp is sized in a starch mixture for smoother running. The loom warped (loomed or dressed) by passing the sized warp threads through two or more heddles attached to harnesses. The power weavers loom is warped by separate workers. Most looms used for industrial purposes have a machine that ties new warps threads to the waste of previously used warps threads, while still on the loom, then an operator rolls the old and new threads back on the warp beam. The harnesses are controlled by cams, dobbies or a Jacquard head.

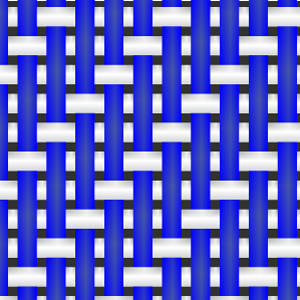
A 3/1 twill weave, as used in denim

The raising and lowering sequence of warp threads in various sequences gives rise to many possible weave structures:

- Plain weave: plain, and hopsacks, poplin, taffeta, poult-de-soie, pibiones and grosgrain
- Twill weave: these are described by weft float followed by warp float, arranged to give diagonal pattern; examples are 2/1 twill, 3/3 twill, or 1/2 twill. These are softer fabrics than plain weaves.
- Satin weave: satins and sateens
- Complex computer-generated interlacings, such as Jacquard fabric
- Pile fabrics: fabrics with a surface of cut threads (a pile), such as velvets and velveteens
- Selvage refers to the fabric's edge, which may be marked with the manufacturer's detail. It is a narrow edge of a woven fabric parallel to its length.
- Thrums are the remainder yarns for tying on the loom. The portion that is not weavable warp. It is also called loom waste.

Both warp and weft can be visible in the final product. By spacing the warp more closely, it can completely cover the weft that binds it, giving a warp faced textile such as rep weave. Conversely, if the warp is spread out, the weft can slide down and completely cover the warp, giving a weft faced textile, such as a tapestry or a Kilim rug. There are a variety of loom styles for hand weaving and tapestry.

== Archaeology ==
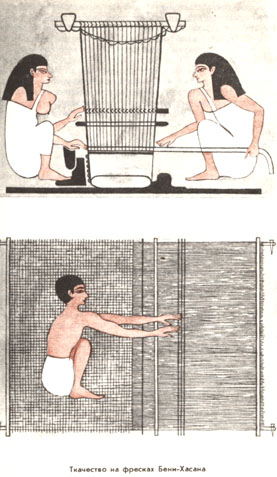
Weaving in ancient Egypt

There are some indications that weaving was already known in the Paleolithic Era, as early as 27,000 years ago. An indistinct textile impression has been found at the Dolní Věstonice site. According to the find, the weavers of the Upper Palaeolithic were manufacturing a variety of cordage types, produced plaited basketry and sophisticated twined and plain woven cloth. The artifacts include imprints in clay and burned remnants of cloth.

The oldest known textiles found in the Americas are remnants of six finely woven textiles and cordage found in Guitarrero Cave, Peru. The weavings, made from plant fibres, are dated between 10,100 and 9080 BCE.

In 2013 a piece of cloth woven from hemp was found in burial F. 7121 at the Çatalhöyük site, suggested to be from around 7000 BCE. Further finds come from the Neolithic civilisation preserved in the pile dwellings in Switzerland.

Another extant fragment from the Neolithic was found in Fayum, at a site dated to about 5000 BCE. This fragment is woven at about 12 threads by 9 threads per centimetre in a plain weave. Flax was the predominant fibre in Egypt at this time (3600 BCE) and had continued popularity in the Nile Valley, though wool became the primary fibre used in other cultures around 2000 BCE.

The oldest-known weavings in North America come from the Windover Archaeological Site in Florida. Dating from 4900 to 6500 BCE and made from plant fibres, the Windover hunter-gatherers produced "finely crafted" twined and plain weave textiles. Eighty-seven pieces of fabric were found associated with 37 burials. Researchers have identified seven different weaves in the fabric. One kind of fabric had 26 strands per inch (10 strands per centimetre). There were also weaves using two-strand and three-strand wefts. A round bag made from twine was found, as well as matting. The yarn was probably made from palm leaves. Cabbage palm, saw palmetto and scrub palmetto are all common in the area, and would have been so 8,000 years ago.

Evidence of weaving as a commercial household industry in the historical region of Macedonia has been found at the Olynthus site. When the city was destroyed by Philip II in 348 BCE, artifacts were preserved in the houses. Loomweights were found in many houses, enough to produce cloth to meet the needs of the household, but some of the houses contained more loomweights, enough for commercial production, and one of the houses was adjacent to the agora and contained three shops where many coins were found. It is probable that such homes were engaged in commercial textile manufacture.

== History ==
Weaving was known in all the great civilisations, but no clear line of causality has been established. Early looms required two people to create the shed and one person to pass through the filling. Early looms wove a fixed length of cloth, but later ones allowed warp to be wound out as the fell progressed. Weaving became simpler when the warp was sized.

=== Africa ===
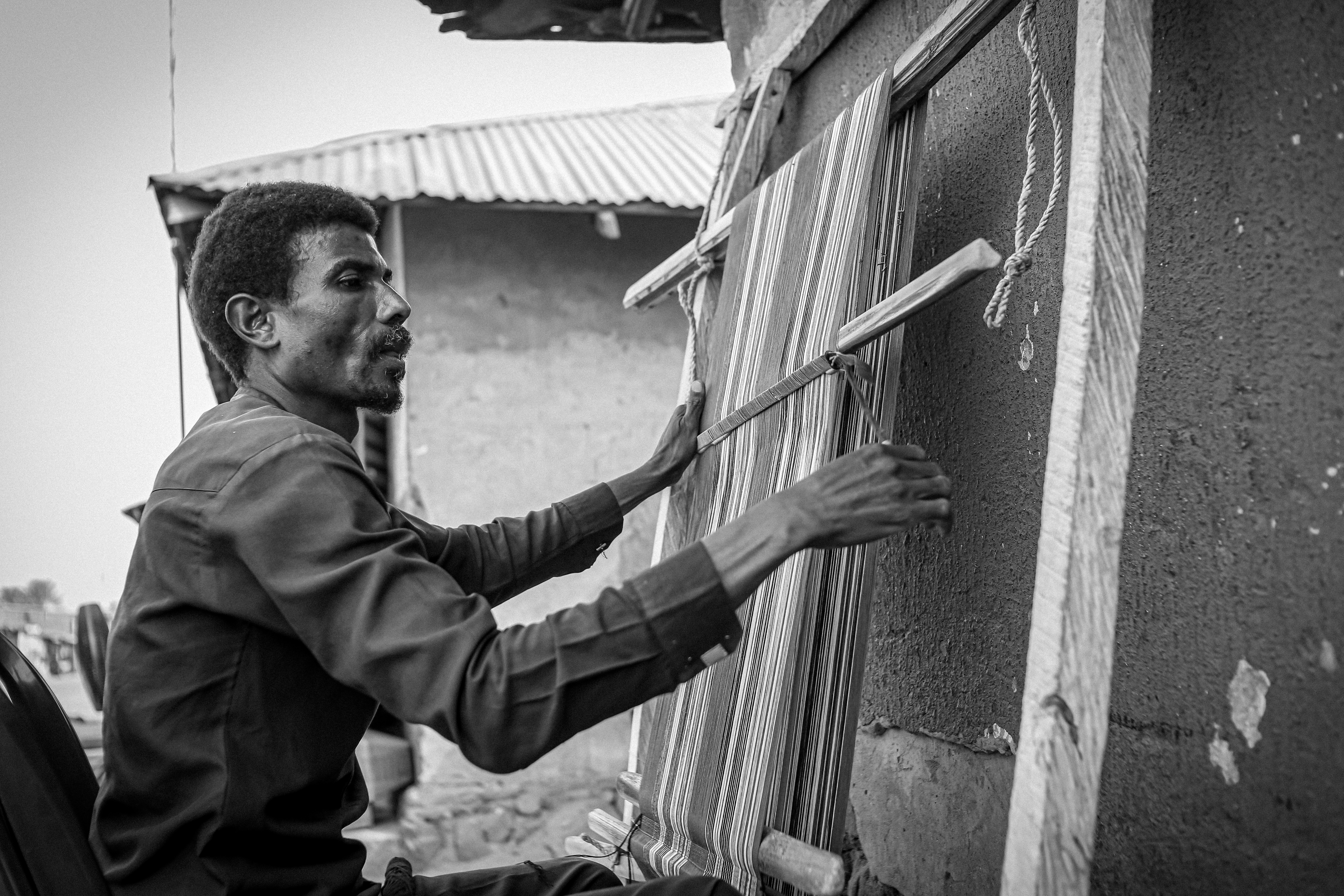

Around the 4th century BCE, the cultivation of cotton and the knowledge of its spinning and weaving in Meroë reached a high level. Export of textiles was one of the main sources of wealth for Kush. Aksumite King Ezana boasted in his inscription that he destroyed large cotton plantations in Meroë during his conquest of the region.

=== Latin America ===
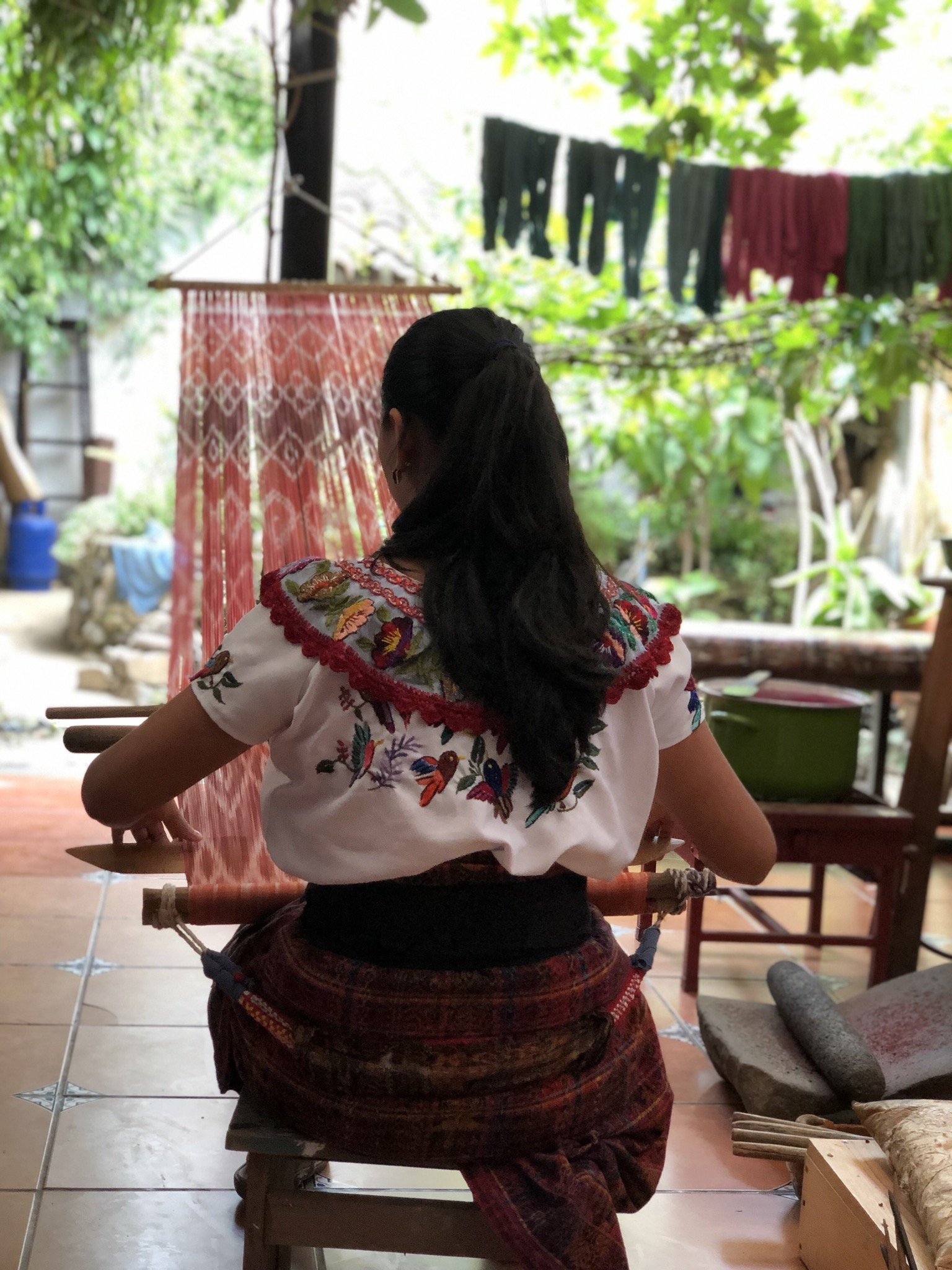
An indigenous woman of the Maya Tzutujil culture weaves using a back-strap loom.

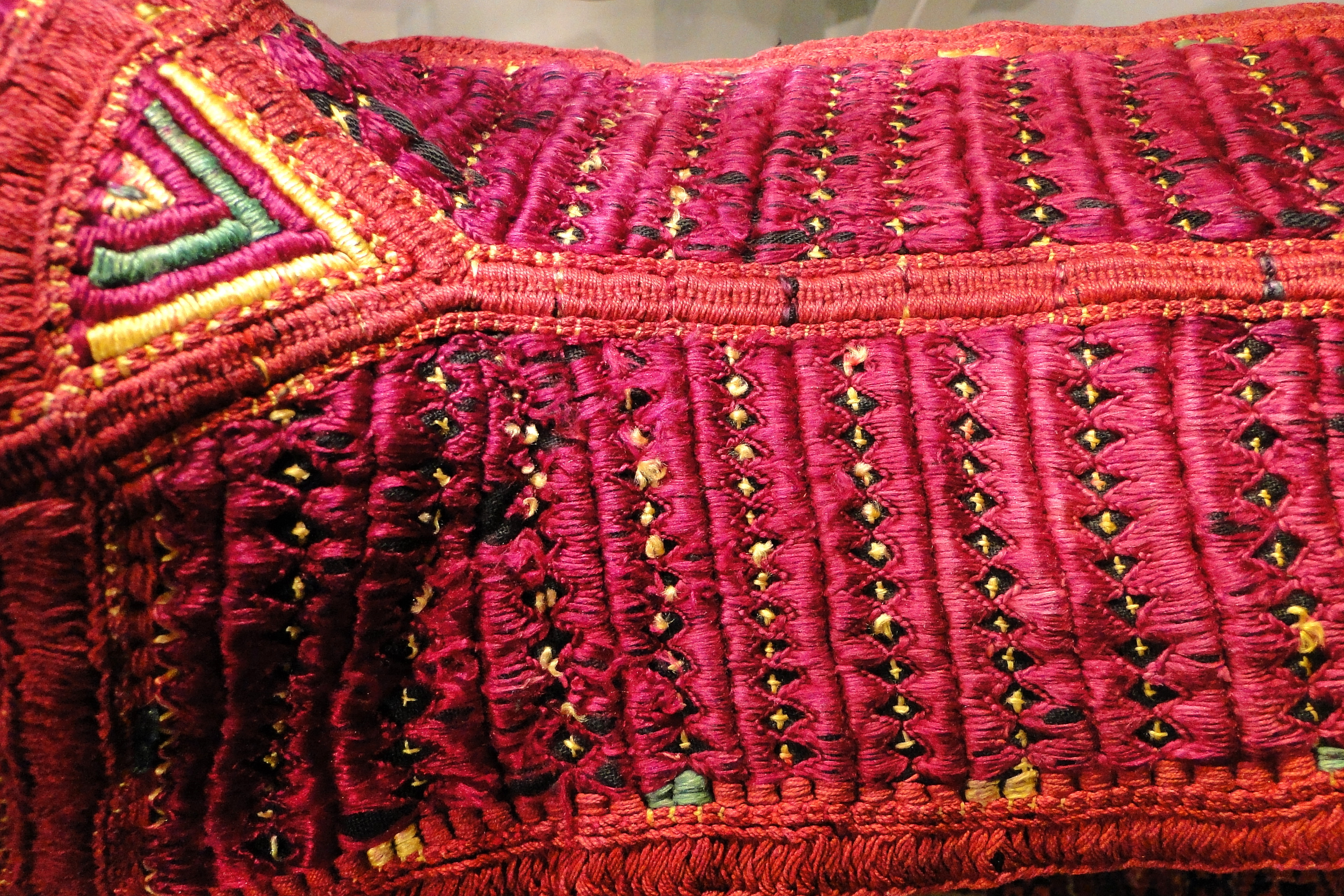
Example of weaving characteristic of Andean civilizations

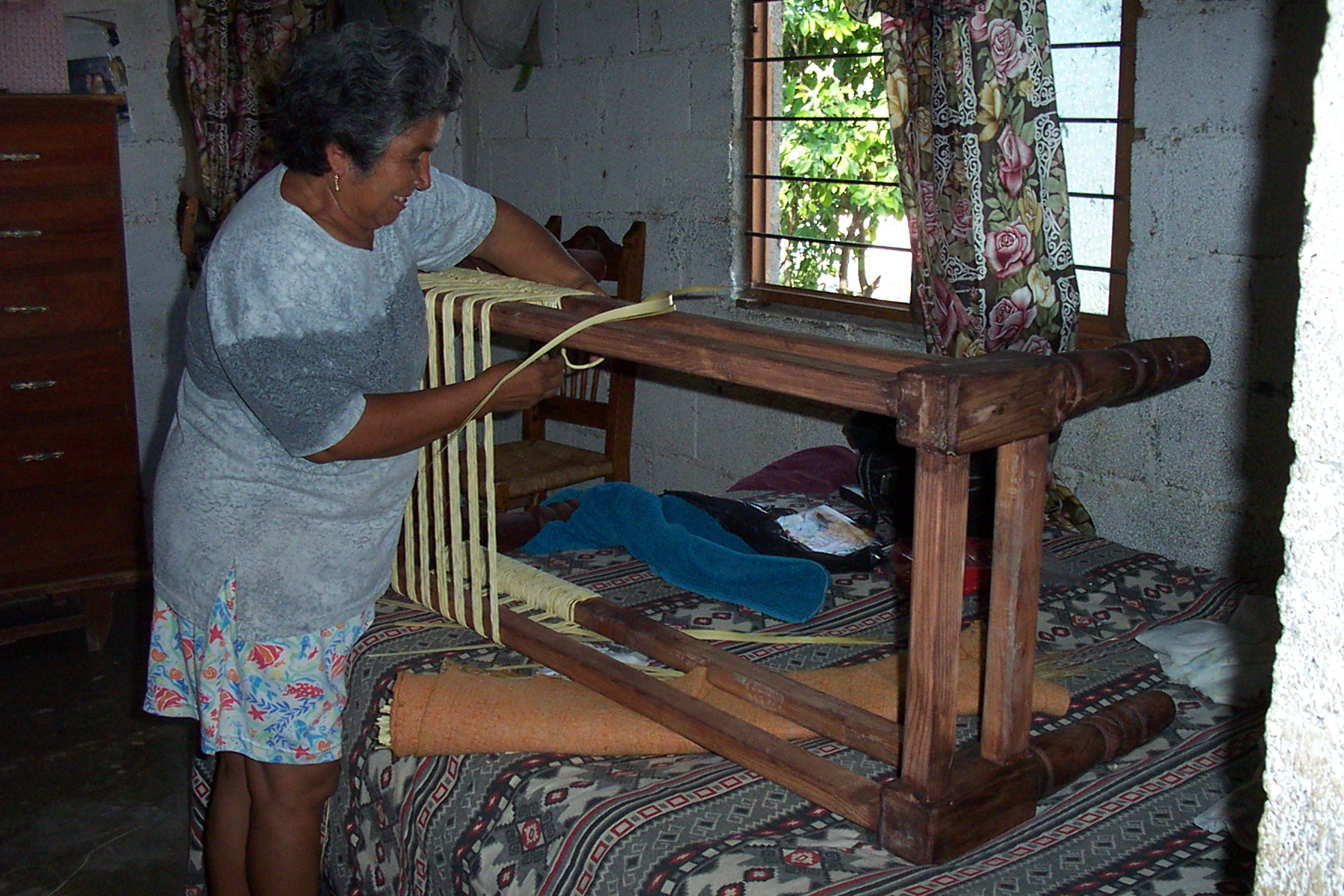
Natural fiber weaver in Nuevo León, Mexico

The Indigenous people of the Americas wove textiles of cotton throughout tropical and subtropical America and in the South American Andes of wool from camelids, primarily domesticated llamas and alpacas. Cotton and the camelids were both domesticated by about 4000 BCE. American weavers are "credited with independently inventing nearly every non-mechanized technique known today."

In the Inca Empire of the Andes, both men and women produced textiles. Women mostly did their weaving using backstrap looms to make small pieces of cloth and vertical frame and single-heddle looms for larger pieces. Men used upright looms. The Inca elite valued cumbi, which was a fine tapestry-woven textile produced on upright looms. The elite often offered cumbi as gifts of reciprocity to lords (other elite) in the Empire. In regions under direct control of the Inca, special artisans produced cumbi for the elite. Women who created cumbi in these regions were called acllas or mamaconas and men were called cumbicamayos. Andean textile weavings were of practical, symbolic, religious, and ceremonial importance and used as currency, tribute, and as a determinant of social class and rank. Sixteenth-century Spanish colonists were impressed by both the quality and quantity of textiles produced by the Inca Empire. Some of the techniques and designs are still in use in the 21st century.

Whereas European cloth-making generally created ornamentation through "suprastructural" means—by adding embroidery, ribbons, brocade, dyeing, and other elements onto the finished woven textile—pre-Columbian Andean weavers created elaborate cloth by focusing on "structural" designs involving manipulation of the warp and weft of the fabric itself. Andeans used "tapestry techniques; double-, triple- and quadruple-cloth techniques; gauze weaves; warp-patterned weaves; discontinuous warp or scaffold weaves; and plain weaves" among many other techniques, in addition to the suprastructural techniques listed above.

=== East Asia ===
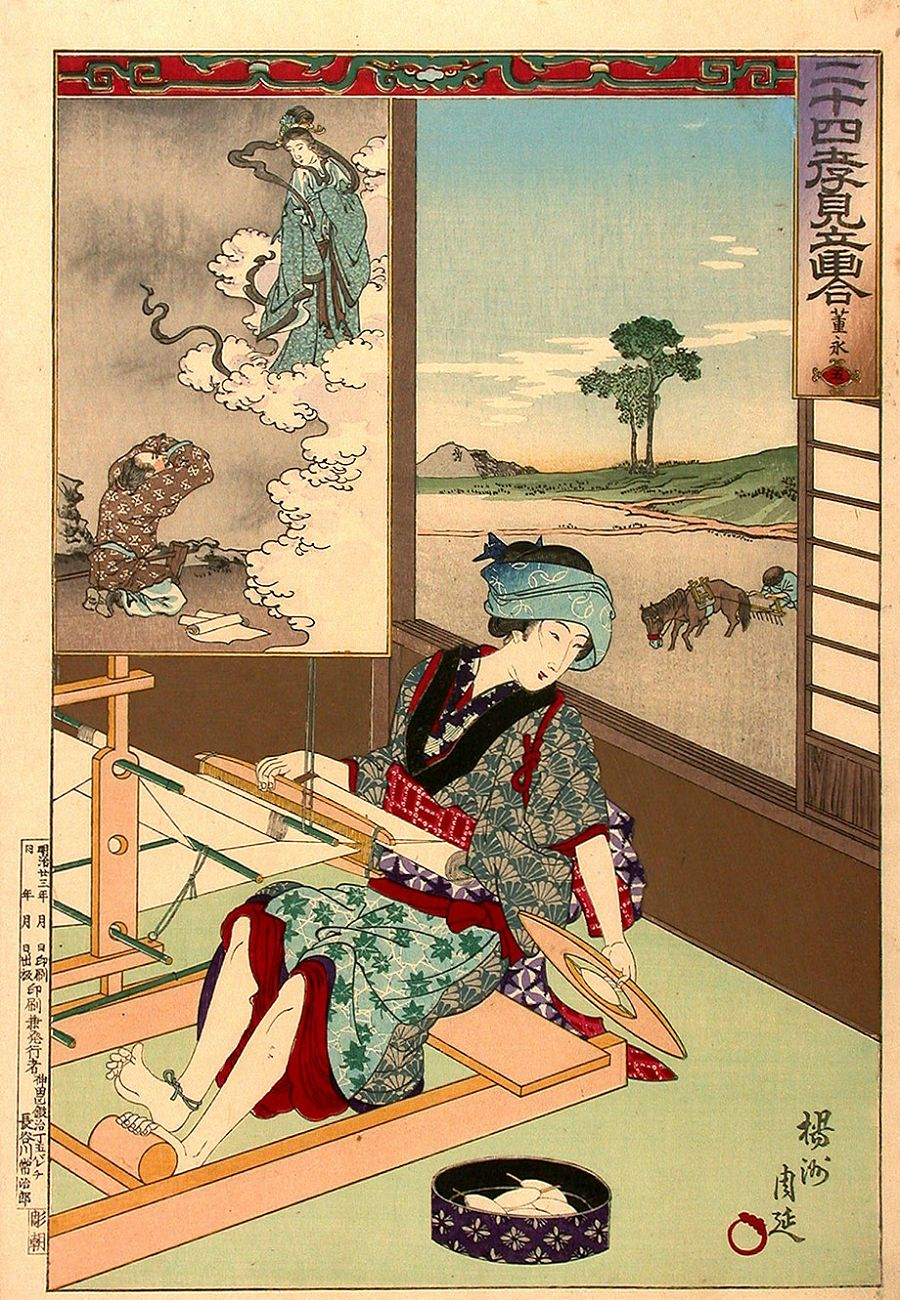
A woman weaving. Ukiyo-e woodblock print by Yōshū Chikanobu, 1890.

The weaving of silk from silkworm cocoons has been known in China since about 3500 BCE. Silk that was intricately woven and dyed, showing a well developed craft, has been found in a Chinese tomb dating back to 2700 BCE.

Silk weaving in China was an intricate process that was very involved. Men and women, usually from the same family, had their own roles in the weaving process. The actual work of weaving was done by both men and women. Women were often weavers since it was a way they could contribute to the household income while staying at home. Women would usually weave simpler designs within the household while men would be in charge of the weaving of more intricate and complex pieces of clothing. The process of sericulture and weaving emphasized the idea that men and women should work together instead of women being subordinate to men. Weaving became an integral part of Chinese women's social identity. Several rituals and myths were associated with the promotion of silk weaving, especially as a symbol of female power. Weaving contributed to the balance between men and women's economic contributions and had many economic benefits.

There were many paths into the occupation of weaver. Women usually married into the occupation, belonged to a family of weavers and or lived in a location that had weather conditions suitable for the process of silk weaving. Weavers usually belonged to the peasant class. Silk weaving became a specialized job requiring specific technology and equipment that was completed domestically within households. Although most of the silk weaving was done within the confines of the home and family, there were some specialized workshops that hired skilled silk weavers as well. These workshops took care of the weaving process, although the raising of the silkworms and reeling of the silk remained work for peasant families. The silk that was woven in workshops rather than homes were of higher quality, since the workshop could afford to hire the best weavers. These weavers were usually men who operated more complicated looms, such as the wooden draw-loom. This created a competitive market of silk weavers.

The quality and ease of the weaving process depended on the silk that was produced by the silk worms. The easiest silk to work with came from breeds of silk worms that spun their cocoons so that it could be unwound in one long strand. The reeling, or unwinding of silk worm cocoons is started by placing the cocoons in boiling water in order to break apart the silk filaments as well as kill the silk worm pupae. Women would then find the end of the strands of silk by sticking their hand into the boiling water. Usually this task was done by girls aged eight to twelve, while the more complex jobs were given to older women. They would then create a silk thread, which could vary in thickness and strength from the unwound cocoons.

After the reeling of the silk, the silk would be dyed before the weaving process began. There were many different looms and tools for weaving. For high quality and intricate designs, a wooden draw-loom or pattern loom was used. This loom would require two or three weavers and was usually operated by men. There were also other smaller looms, such as the waist loom, that could be operated by a single woman and were usually used domestically.

Sericulture and silk weaving spread to Korea by 200 BCE, to Khotan by 50 CE, and to Japan by about 300 CE.

The pit-treadle loom may have originated in India though most authorities establish the invention in China. Pedals were added to operate heddles. By the Middle Ages such devices also appeared in Persia, Sudan, Egypt and possibly the Arabian Peninsula, where "the operator sat with his feet in a pit below a fairly low-slung loom". In 700 CE, horizontal looms and vertical looms could be found in many parts of Asia, Africa and Europe. In Africa, the rich dressed in cotton while the poorer wore wool. By the 12th century it had come to Europe either from the Byzantium or Moorish Spain where the mechanism was raised higher above the ground on a more substantial frame.

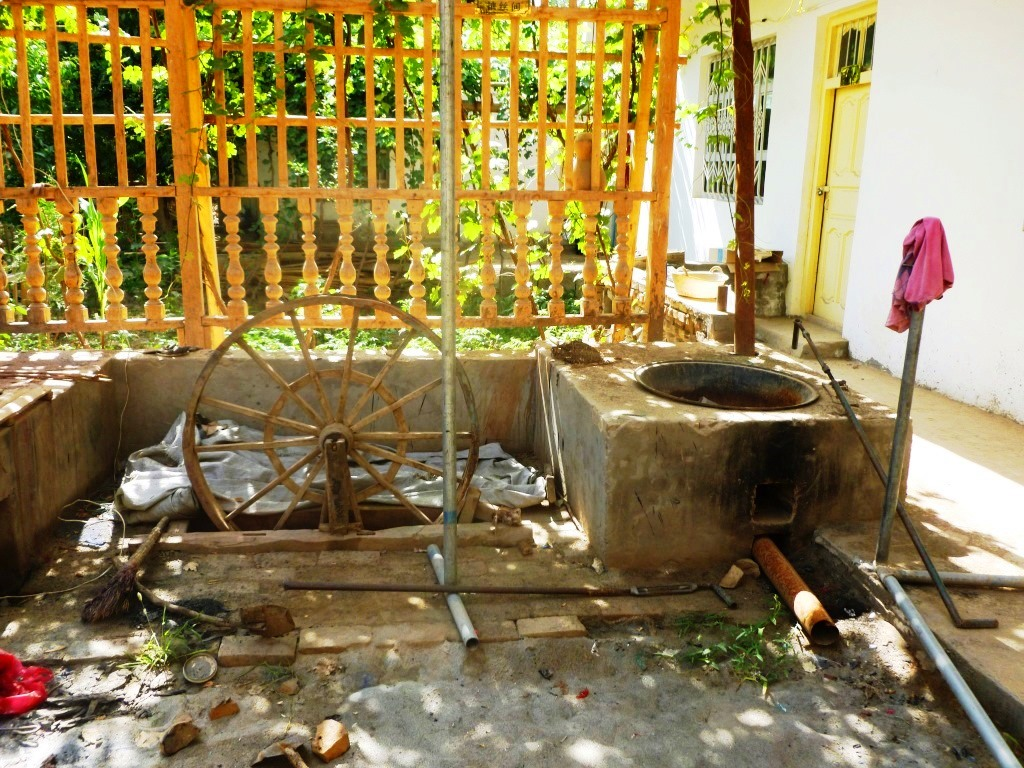
Equipment for unraveling silk cocoons, Khotan

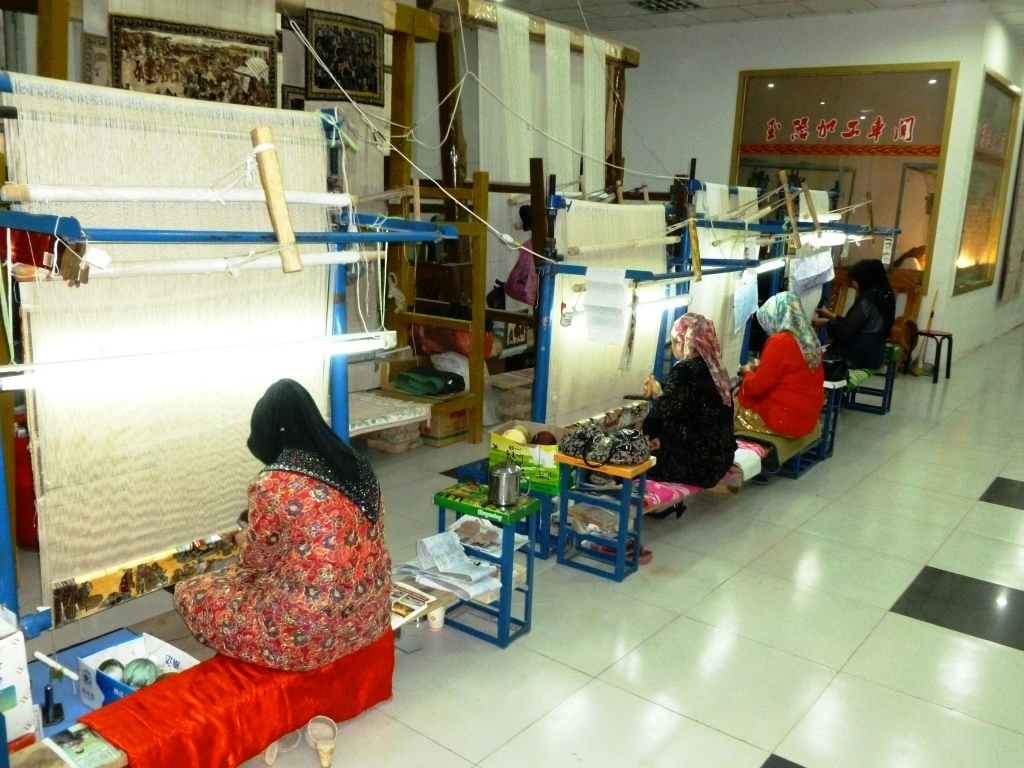
Women weaving silk, Kashgar

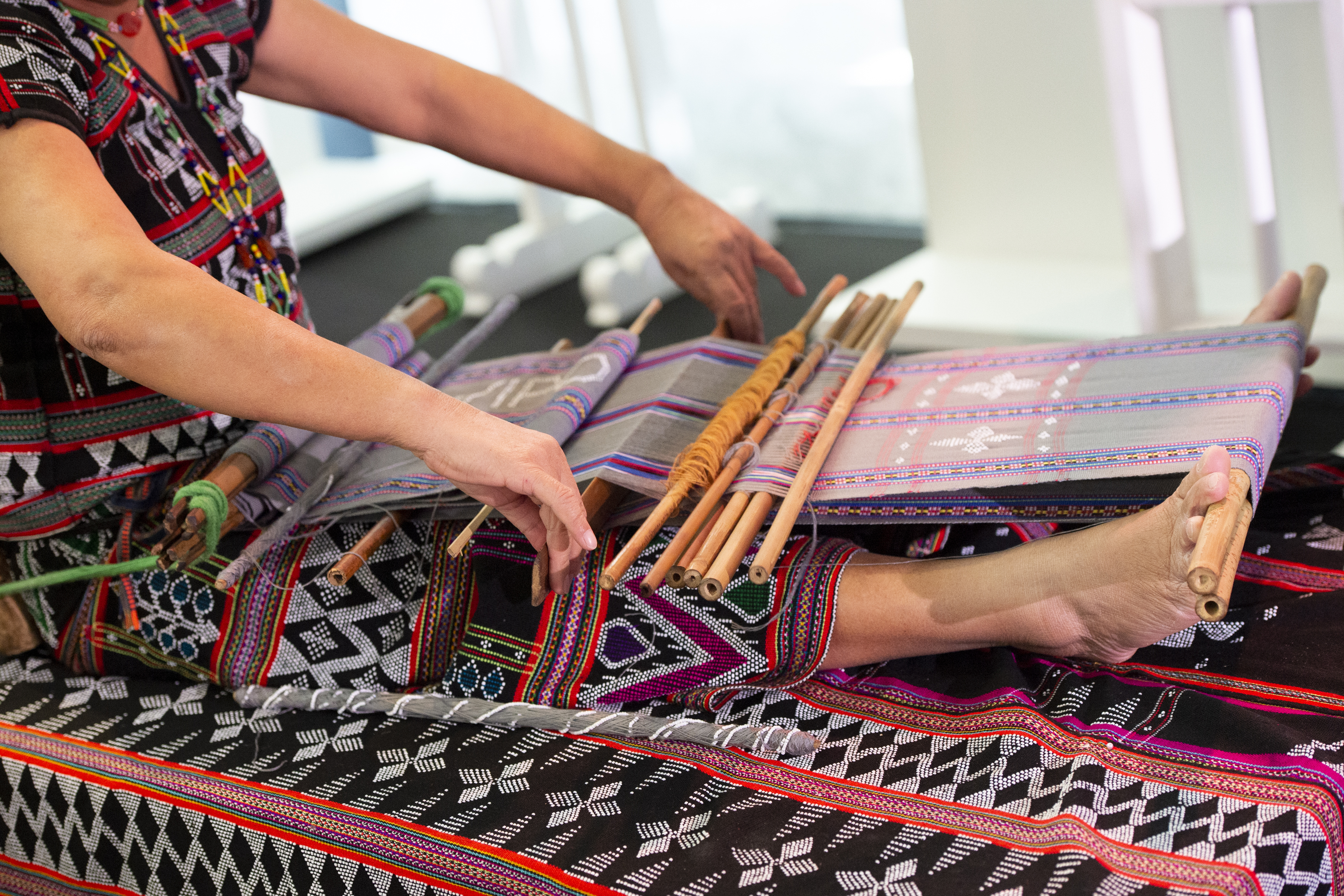
A traditional Vietnamese brocade and silk products weaver using a handloom

=== Southeast Asia ===
In the Philippines, numerous pre-colonial weaving traditions exist among different ethnic groups. They used various plant fibers, mainly abacá or banana, but also including tree cotton, buri palm (locally known as buntal) and other palms, various grasses (like amumuting and tikog), and barkcloth. The oldest evidence of weaving traditions are Neolithic stone tools used for preparing barkcloth found in archeological sites in Sagung Cave of southern Palawan and Arku Cave of Peñablanca, Cagayan. The latter has been dated to around 1255–605 BCE.

Other countries in Southeast Asia have their own extensive history of weaving traditions. Weaving was introduced to Southeast Asia at the same time rice agriculture was introduced from China. As it was introduced alongside rice farming, weaving became popular in communities where rice was being farmed compared to communities that rely on hunting, gathering, and animal farming.

Each country has its own distinctive weaving traditions or has absorbed weaving traditions from their neighboring countries. The most common material used for weaving is cotton that is interwoven with threads made of different materials. Brunei is famous for its Jong Sarat, a cloth usually used in traditional weddings, uses silver and gold threads interwoven usually with cotton threads. Similarly, Indonesia has the Songket, also used in traditional weddings, which also utilizes gold and silver wrapped thread to create elaborate designs on their weaved textiles. On the other hand, Cambodia has the Ikat, which utilizes the method of dyeing thunks of thread tied with fiber to create patterns while weaving. In addition to using threads, weavers of Myanmar, Thailand, and Vietnam combine silk and other fibers with cotton for weaving. While in Laos, natural materials are used, like roots, tree bark, leaves, flowers, and seeds, but for dyeing the textile that has been already weaved. These countries in Southeast Asia have more weaving traditions but these techniques are the popular ones.

To create threads of cotton for weaving, spindle whorls were commonly used in Southeast Asia. It is made from either clay, stone or wood and has a variety of appearances regarding its shape and size. Spindle whorls were said to emerge in Southeast Asia along with expansion of rice agriculture from Yangtse, China. Additionally, its increasing appearance in certain regions of Southeast Asia back then may be also a sign of the enlargement of cotton thread and textile production. Due to its low cost and portability because of its small size, it was favored among rural weaving communities in countries of Southeast Asia.

Weaved textiles in Southeast Asia are mostly made with looms. The foot brace loom is the earliest loom introduced to Southeast Asia from China, having its first appearance in Vietnam. Although, it was only used in certain areas of Vietnam, Laos, Indonesia, and Cambodia. Another loom that is widely used across Southeast Asia is the ground level body tension loom, also known as the belt loom, as a part of it needs to be attached to a belt-like strap on the weaver's waist to control and hold the tension of the warped threads. It is usually operated at the ground level and the weaver is able to control the threads by leaning backwards and forward. The body tension loom was developed from the foot-brace loom to eventually accommodate weaving of larger and wider cloth types.

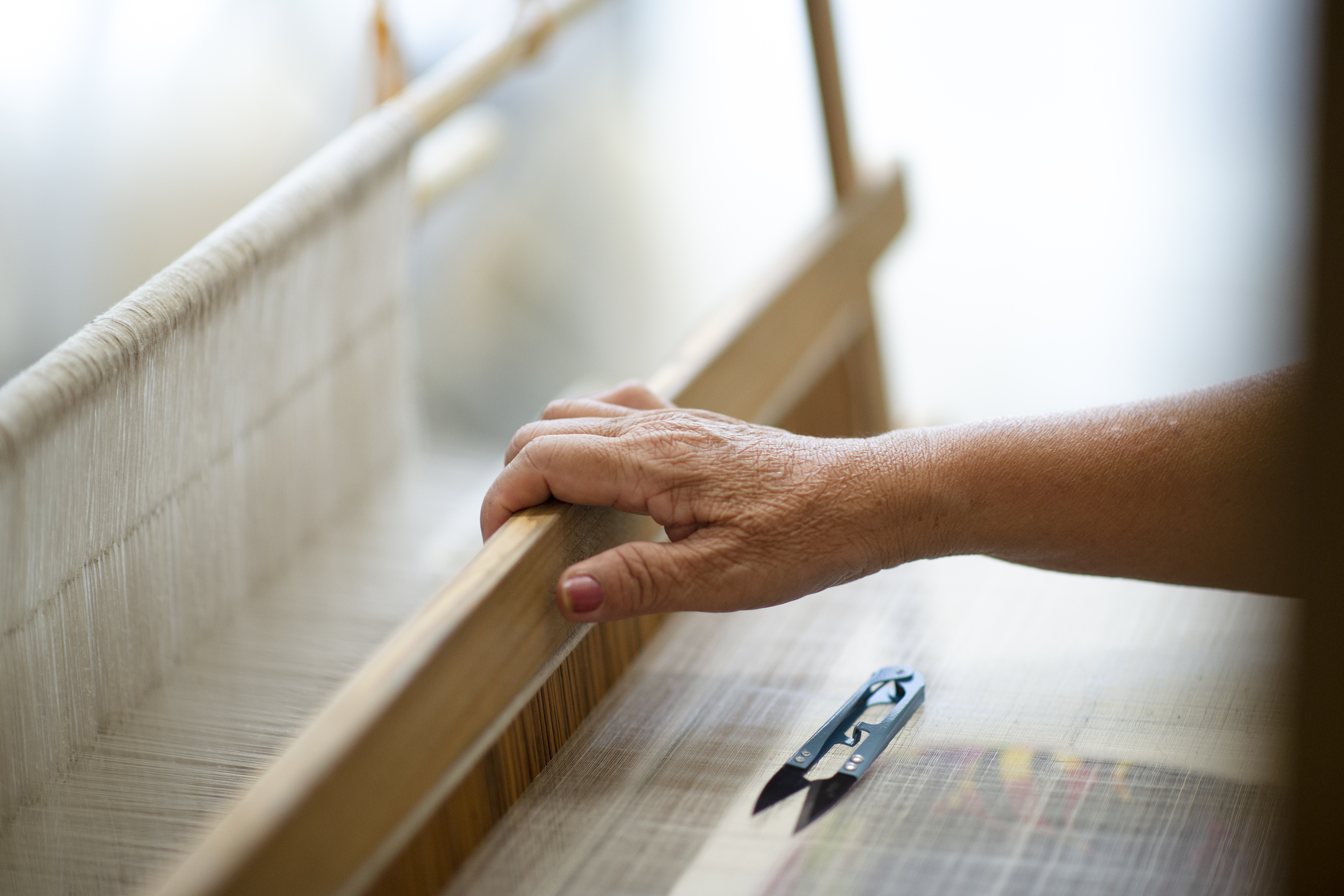
Contemporary Philippines weaver demonstrating pineapple-plant fiber and silk cloths being woven in a traditional loom

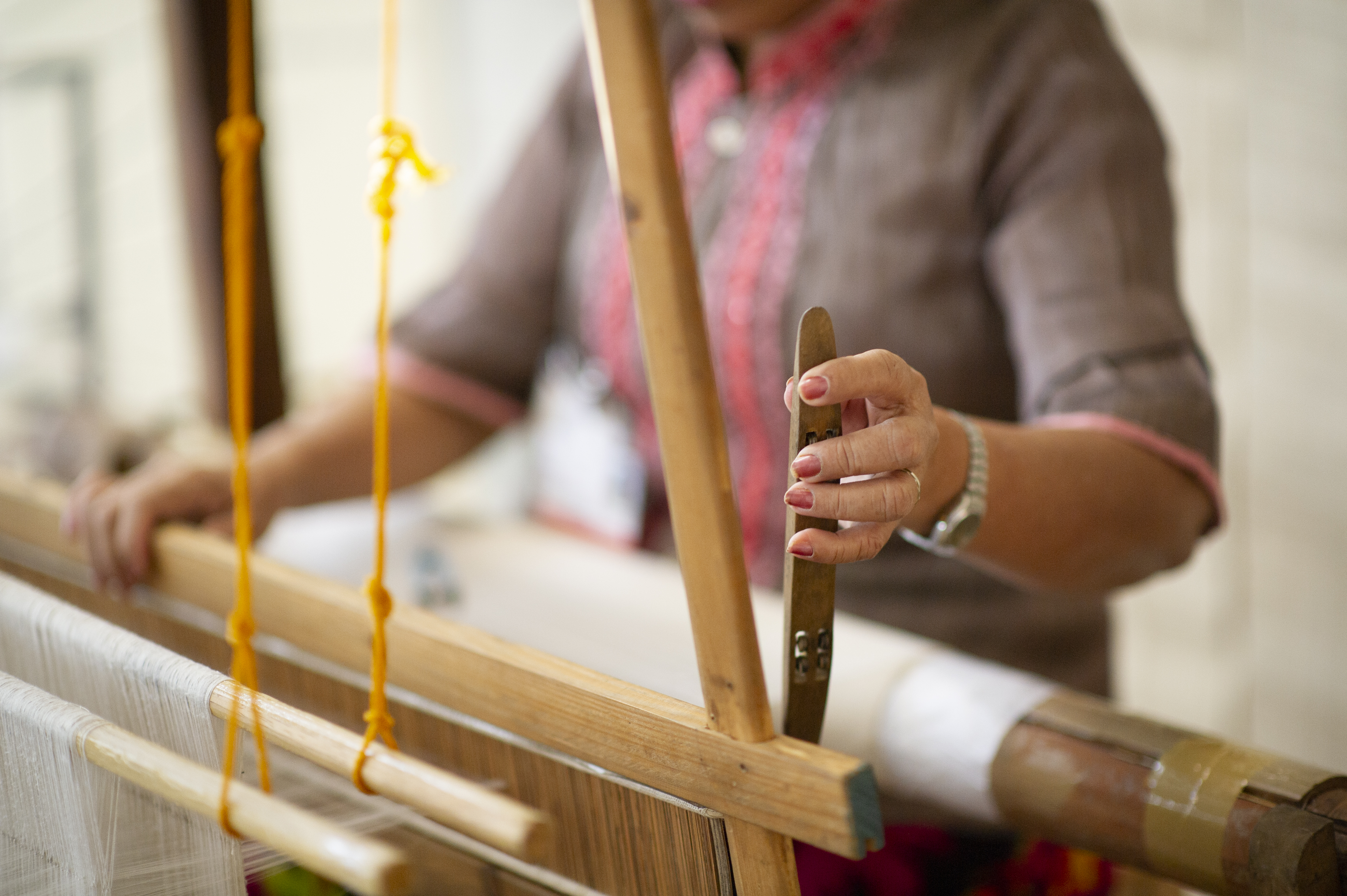
Pineapple-plant fiber and silk threads being woven in a traditional loom

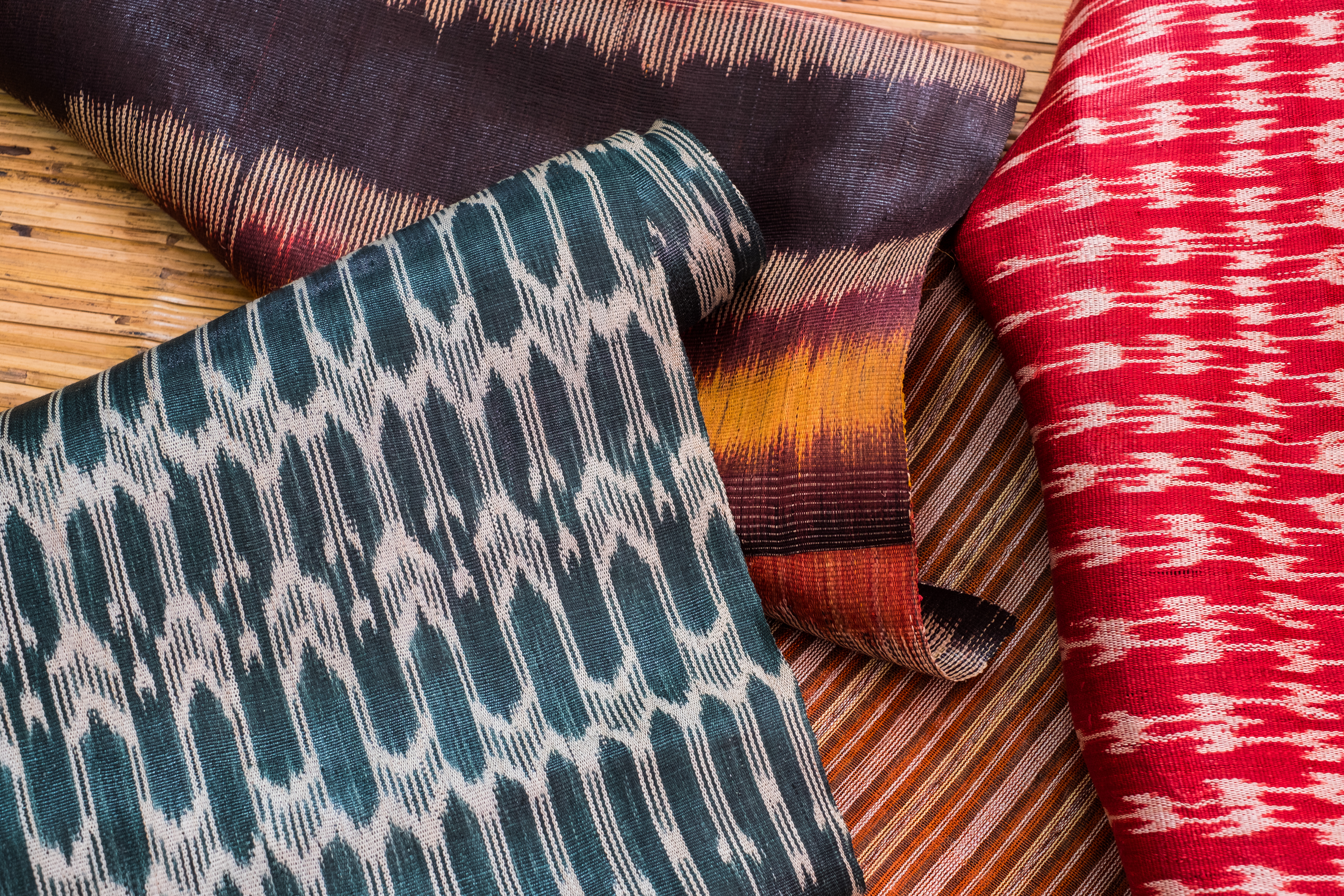
T'nalak cloth by T'boli dream weavers. Like most indigenous pre-colonial Filipino textiles, they were typically made from abacá fibers.

=== Medieval Europe ===
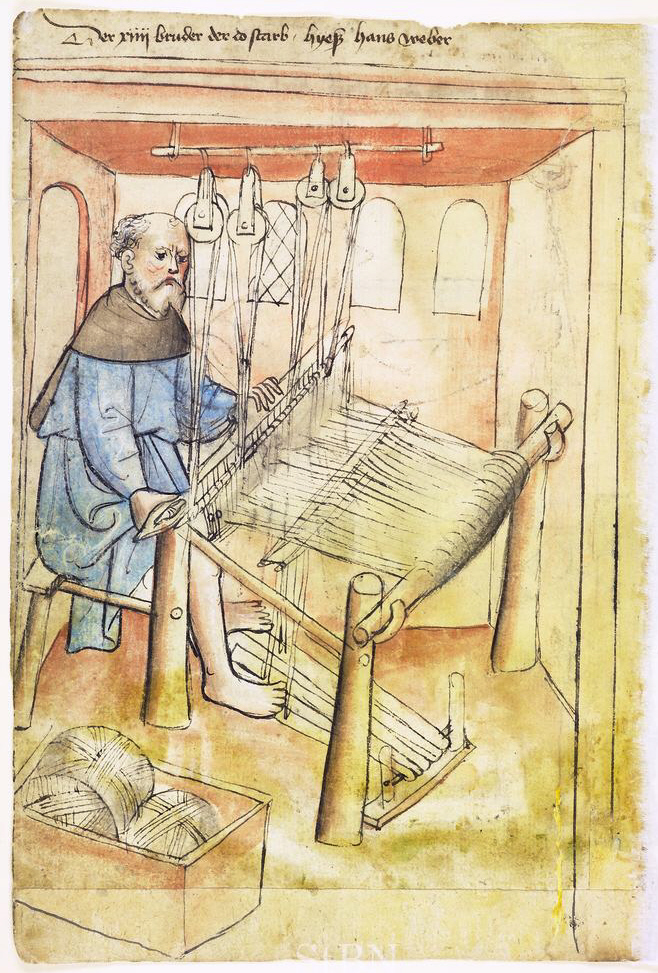
Weaver, Nuremberg, c. 1425

The predominant fibre in Europe during the medieval period was wool, followed by linen and nettlecloth for the lower classes. Cotton was introduced to Sicily and Spain in the 9th century. When Sicily was captured by the Normans, they took the technology to Northern Italy and then the rest of Europe. Silk fabric production was reintroduced towards the end of this period and the more sophisticated silk weaving techniques were applied to the other staples.

The weaver worked at home and marketed his cloth at fairs. Warp-weighted looms were commonplace in Europe before the introduction of horizontal looms in the 10th and 11th centuries. Weaving became an urban craft and to regulate their trade, craftsmen applied to establish a guild. These initially were merchant guilds, but developed into separate trade guilds for each skill. The cloth merchant who was a member of a city's weavers guild was allowed to sell cloth; he acted as a middleman between the tradesmen weavers and the purchaser. The trade guilds controlled quality and the training needed before an artisan could call himself a weaver.

By the 13th century, an organisational change took place, and a system of putting out was introduced. The cloth merchant purchased the wool and provided it to the weaver, who sold his produce back to the merchant. The merchant controlled the rates of pay and economically dominated the cloth industry. The merchants' prosperity is reflected in the wool towns of eastern England; Norwich, Bury St Edmunds and Lavenham being good examples.

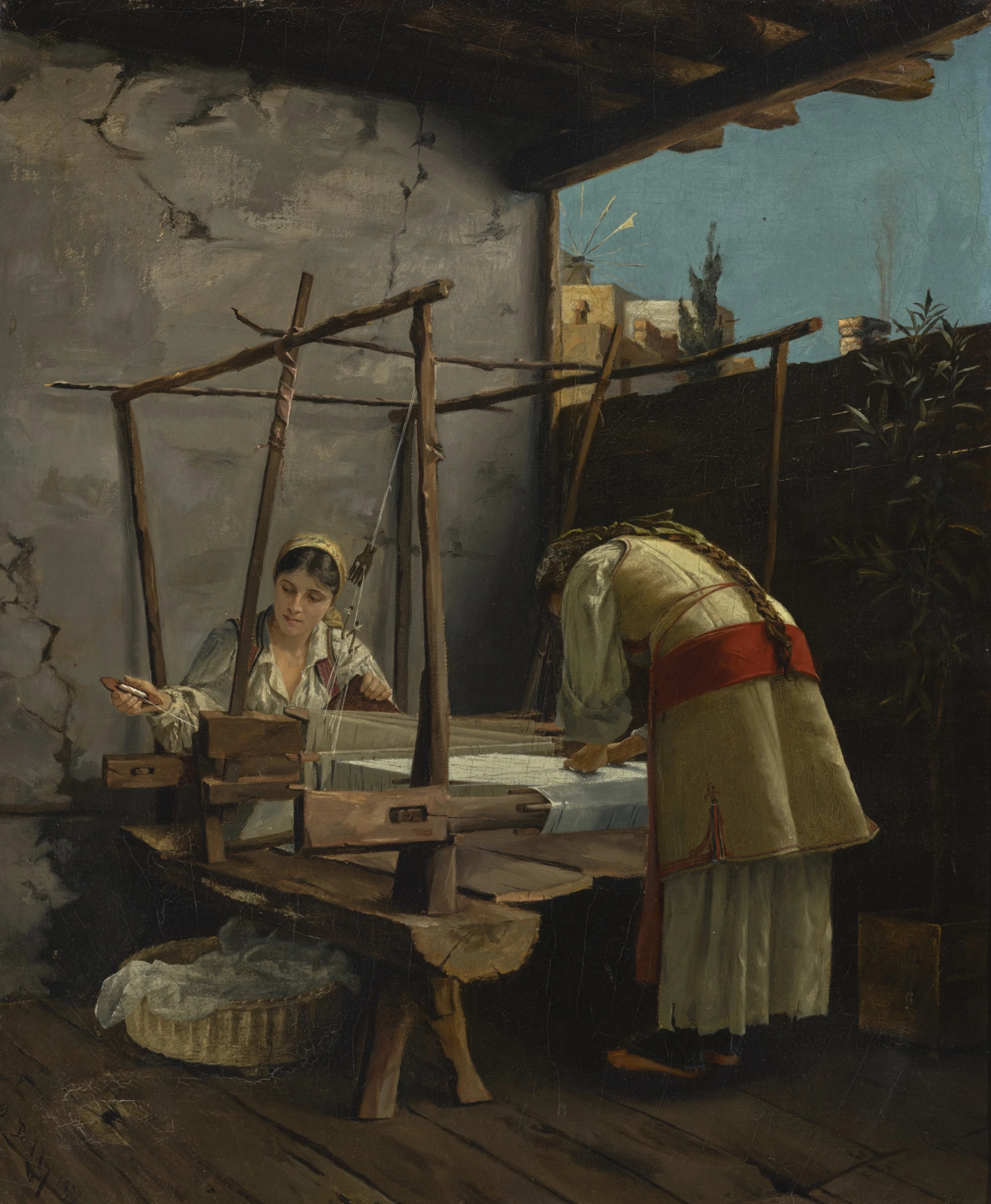
The Weavers, Arachova by Théodore Jacques Ralli c. 1877, women weaving in the Greek village of Arachova

Wool was a political issue. The supply of thread has always limited the output of a weaver. About that time, the spindle method of spinning was replaced by the great wheel and soon after the treadle-driven spinning wheel. The loom remained the same but with the increased volume of thread it could be operated continuously.

The 14th century saw considerable flux in population. The 13th century had been a period of relative peace; Europe became overpopulated. Poor weather led to a series of poor harvests and starvation. There was great loss of life in the Hundred Years War. Then in 1346, Europe was struck with the Black Death and the population was reduced by up to a half. Arable land was labour-intensive and sufficient workers no longer could be found. Land prices dropped, and land was sold and put to sheep pasture. Traders from Florence and Bruges bought the wool, then sheep-owning landlords started to weave wool outside the jurisdiction of the city and trade guilds. The weavers started by working in their own homes then production was moved into purpose-built buildings. The working hours and the amount of work were regulated. The putting-out system had been replaced by a factory system.

The migration of the Huguenot Weavers, Calvinists fleeing from religious persecution in mainland Europe, to Britain around the time of 1685 challenged the English weavers of cotton, woollen and worsted cloth, who subsequently learned the Huguenots' superior techniques.

=== Colonial United States ===
Colonial America relied heavily on Great Britain for manufactured goods of all kinds. British policy was to encourage the production of raw materials in colonies and discourage manufacturing. The Wool Act 1699 restricted the export of colonial wool. As a result, many people wove cloth from locally produced fibres. The colonists also used wool, cotton and flax (linen) for weaving, though hemp could be made into serviceable canvas and heavy cloth. They could get one cotton crop each year; until the invention of the cotton gin it was a labour-intensive process to separate the seeds from the fibres. Functional tape, bands, straps, and fringe were woven on box and paddle looms.

A plain weave was preferred as the added skill and time required to make more complex weaves kept them from common use. Sometimes designs were woven into the fabric but most were added after weaving using wood block prints or embroidery.

=== Industrial Revolution ===
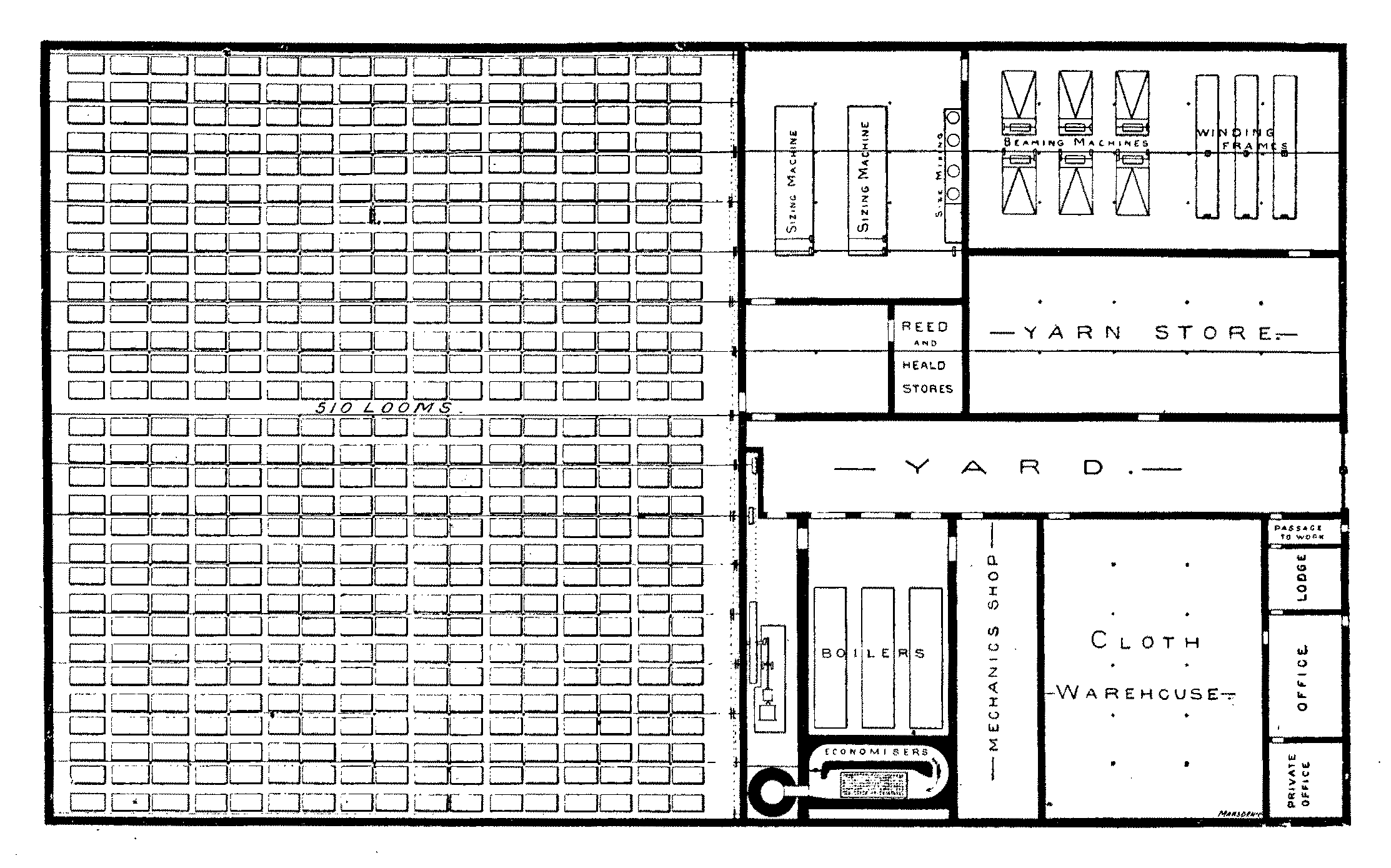
By 1892, most cotton weaving was done in similar weaving sheds, powered by steam.

Before the Industrial Revolution, weaving was a manual craft and wool was the principal staple. In the great wool districts a form of factory system had been introduced but in the uplands weavers worked from home on a putting-out system. The wooden looms of that time might be broad or narrow; broad looms were those too wide for the weaver to pass the shuttle through the shed, so that the weaver needed an expensive assistant (often an apprentice). This ceased to be necessary after John Kay invented the flying shuttle in 1733. The shuttle and the picking stick sped up the process of weaving. There was thus a shortage of thread or a surplus of weaving capacity. The opening of the Bridgewater Canal in June 1761 allowed cotton to be brought into Manchester, an area rich in fast flowing streams that could be used to power machinery. Spinning was the first to be mechanised (spinning jenny, spinning mule), and this led to limitless thread for the weaver.

In 1784 Edmund Cartwright first proposed building a weaving machine that would function similarly to recently developed cotton-spinning mills, drawing scorn from critics who said the weaving process was too nuanced to automate. He built a factory at Doncaster and obtained a series of patents between 1785 and 1792. In 1788, his brother Major John Cartwight built Revolution Mill at Retford (named for the centenary of the Glorious Revolution). In 1791, he licensed his loom to the Grimshaw brothers of Manchester, but their Knott Mill burnt down the following year (possibly a case of arson). Edmund Cartwight was granted a reward of £10,000 by Parliament for his efforts in 1809. However, success in power-weaving also required improvements by others, including H. Horrocks of Stockport. Only during the two decades after about 1805, did power-weaving take hold. At that time there were 250,000 hand weavers in the UK. Textile manufacture was one of the leading sectors in the British Industrial Revolution, but weaving was a comparatively late sector to be mechanised. The loom became semi-automatic in 1842 with Kenworthy and Bulloughs Lancashire Loom. The various innovations took weaving from a home-based artisan activity (labour-intensive and man-powered) to steam driven factories process. A large metal manufacturing industry grew to produce the looms, firms such as Howard & Bullough of Accrington, and Tweedales and Smalley and Platt Brothers. Most power weaving took place in weaving sheds, in small towns circling Greater Manchester away from the cotton spinning area. The earlier combination mills where spinning and weaving took place in adjacent buildings became rarer. Wool and worsted weaving took place in West Yorkshire and particular Bradford, here there were large factories such as Lister's or Drummond's, where all the processes took place. Both men and women with weaving skills emigrated, and took the knowledge to their new homes in New England, to places like Pawtucket and Lowell.

Woven 'grey cloth' was then sent to the finishers where it was bleached, dyed and printed. Natural dyes were originally used, with synthetic dyes coming in the second half of the 19th century. A demand for new dyes followed the discovery of mauveine in 1856, and its popularity in fashion. Researchers continued to explore the chemical potential of coal tar waste from the growing number of gas works in Britain and Europe, creating an entirely new sector in the chemical industry.

The invention in France of the Jacquard loom, by Joseph Marie Jacquard patented in 1804, enabled complicated patterned cloths to be woven, by using punched cards to determine which threads of coloured yarn should appear on the upper side of the cloth. The jacquard allowed individual control of each warp thread, row by row without repeating, so very complex patterns were suddenly feasible. Samples exist showing calligraphy, and woven copies of engravings. Jacquards could be attached to handlooms or powerlooms.

A distinction can be made between the role and lifestyle and status of a handloom weaver, and that of the power loom weaver and craft weaver. The perceived threat of the power loom led to disquiet and industrial unrest. Well known protests movements such as the Luddites and the Chartists had handloom weavers amongst their leaders. In the early 19th-century power weaving became viable. Richard Guest in 1823 made a comparison of the productivity of power and handloom weavers:

A very good Hand Weaver, a man twenty-five or thirty years of age, will weave two pieces of nine-eighths shirting per week, each twenty-four yards long, and containing one hundred and five shoots of weft in an inch, the reed of the cloth being a forty-four, Bolton count, and the warp and weft forty hanks to the pound, A Steam Loom Weaver, fifteen years of age, will in the same time weave seven similar pieces.

He then speculates about the wider economics of using power loom weavers:

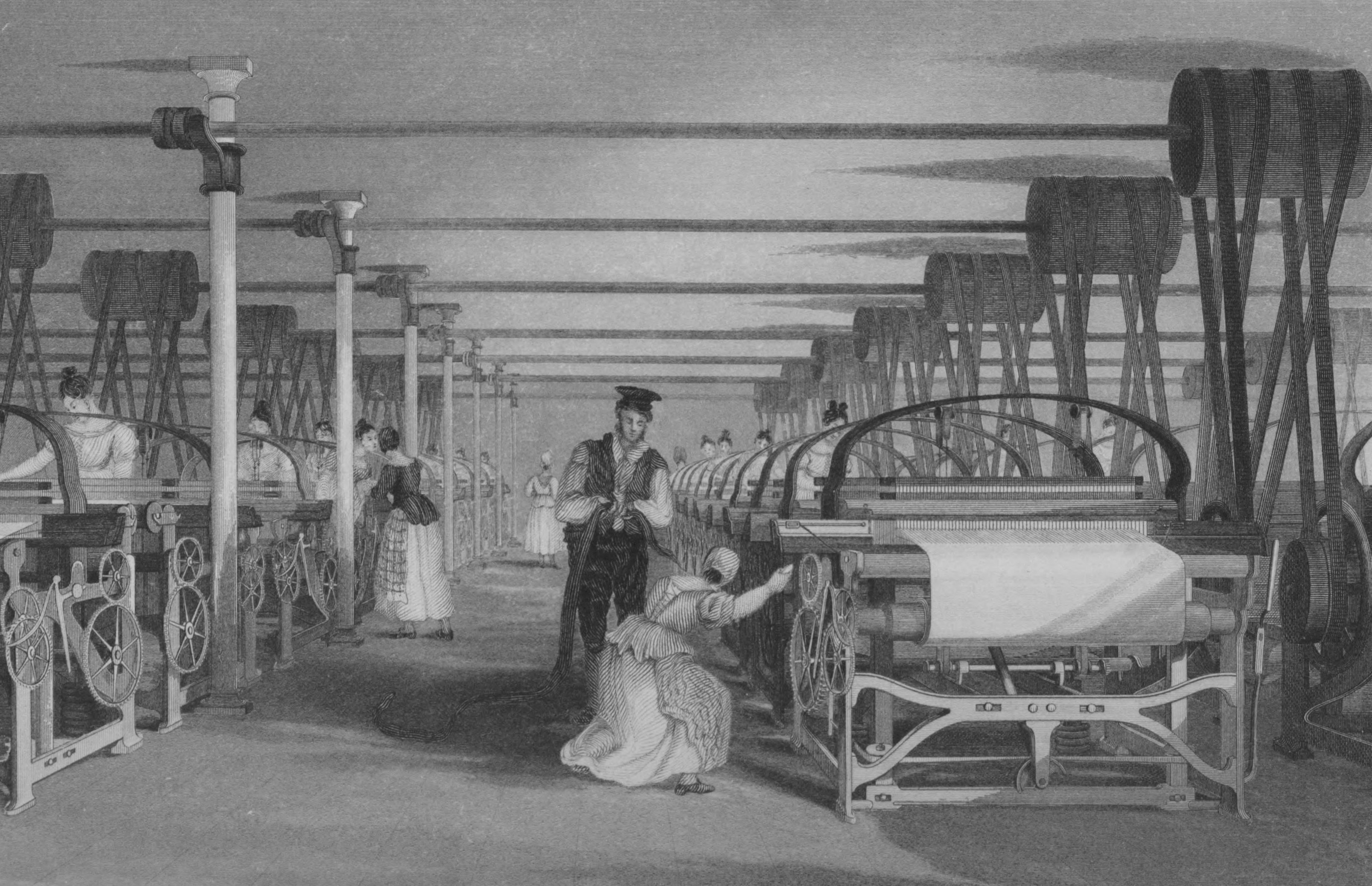
Women featured weaving at power looms in 1835

...it may very safely be said, that the work is done in a Steam Factory containing two hundred Looms, would, if done by hand Weavers, find employment and support for a population of more than two thousand persons.

With the Industrial Revolution came a growth in opportunity for women to work within textile factories. However, in spite of their gender, their work was perceived to have a lower social and economic value than work done by their male counterparts.

=== Modern day ===
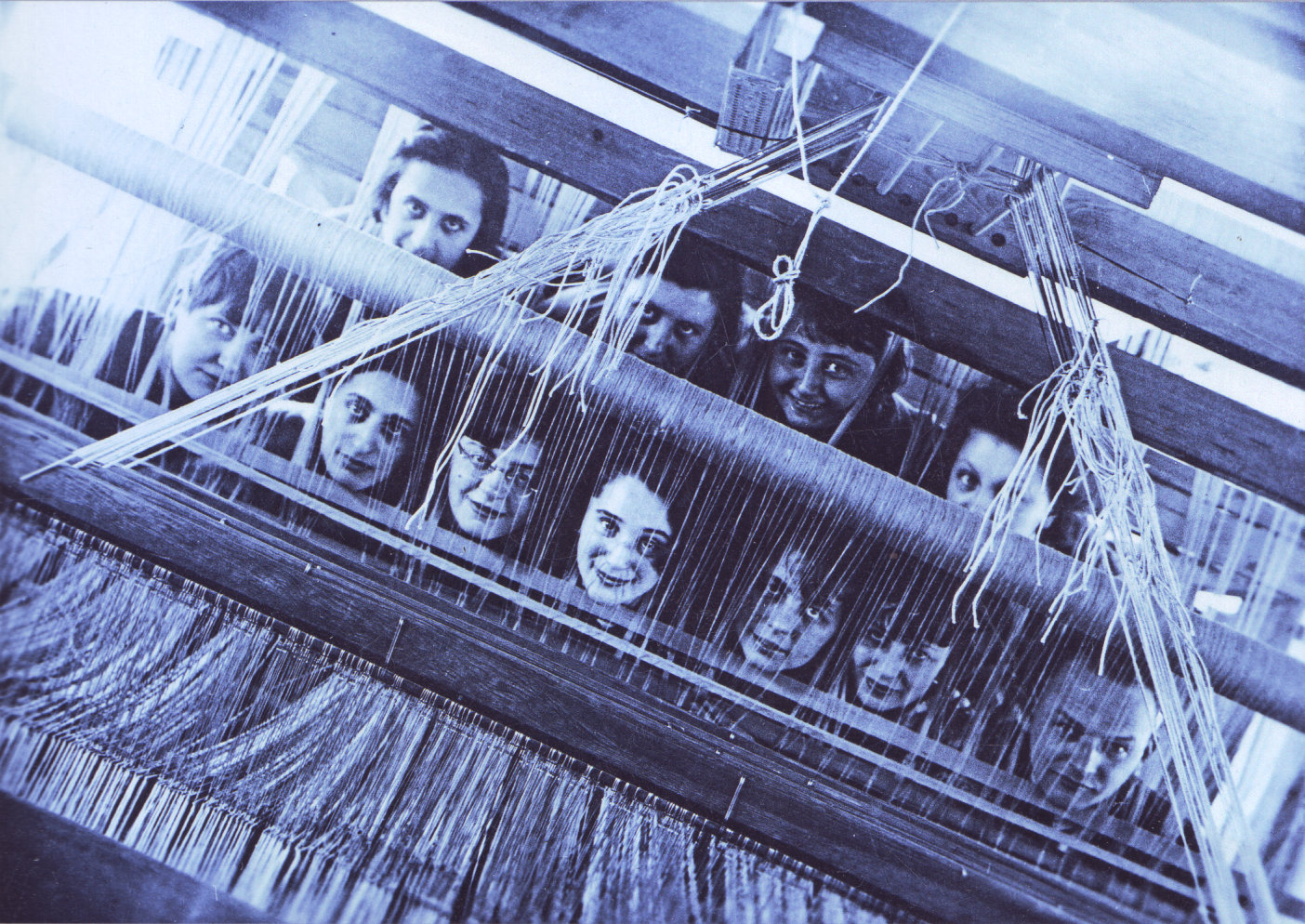
Weavers of the Bauhaus workshop in a photo taken by Lux Feininger

In the 1920s the weaving workshop of the Bauhaus design school in Germany aimed to raise weaving, previously seen as a craft, to a fine art, and also to investigate the industrial requirements of modern weaving and fabrics. Under the direction of Gunta Stölzl, the workshop experimented with unorthodox materials, including cellophane, fibreglass, and metal. From expressionist tapestries to the development of soundproofing and light-reflective fabric, the workshop's innovative approach instigated a modernist theory of weaving. Former Bauhaus student and teacher Anni Albers published the seminal 20th-century text On Weaving in 1965. Other notables from the Bauhaus weaving workshop include Otti Berger, Margaretha Reichardt, and Benita Koch-Otte.

In the Bauhaus, the weaving workshop was considered "the women's department", and many women were forced to join against wishes to study another art form. Some weavers, like Helene Nonné-Schmidt believed that women were made to weave because they could only produce work in 2D. She thought women lacked the spatial imagination and genius men had to work in other mediums.

Hand weaving of Persian carpets and kilims has been an important element of the tribal crafts of many of the subregions of modern day Iran. Examples of carpet types are the Lavar Kerman carpet from Kerman and the Seraband rug from Arāk.

In Southeast Asia, some communities are working to revive weaving traditions as a way to address poverty, improve living conditions, support local communities, and to promote environmental sustainability. Several initiatives have been established to support this effort, such as the Maybank Women Eco-Weavers program by the Maybank Foundation which currently operates in Laos, Cambodia, Malaysia and Indonesia. This program helps create opportunities for women weavers throughout the Southeast Asia region to improve their livelihoods and to give them financial independence.

Additionally, similar programs exist in Taiwan and in the Philippines. In Taiwan, The Lihang Studio and S'uraw Education was founded by Yuma Taru to revive the Atayal weaving culture and to promote indigenous education in weaving and dyeing. In the Philippines, the Kyyangan Weavers Association was established in the Ifugao Province as a way to conserve and promote the Ifugao weaving culture and other traditional practices. Also, this association collaborates with academic institutions, government agencies and other non-government organizations on research and product development to be able to offer economic opportunities for communities.

== Types of weavers ==
=== Hand loom weavers ===
Handloom weaving was done by both genders but men outnumbered women partially due to the strength needed to batten. They worked from home sometimes in a well-lit attic room. The women of the house would spin the thread they needed, and attend to finishing. Later women took to weaving, they obtained their thread from the spinning mill, and working as outworkers on a piecework contract. Over time competition from the power looms drove down the piece rate and they existed in increasing poverty.

=== Power loom weavers ===
Power loom workers were usually girls and young women. They had the security of fixed hours, and except in times of hardship, such as in the cotton famine, regular income. They were paid a wage and a piece work bonus. Even when working in a combined mill, weavers stuck together and enjoyed a tight-knit community. The women usually minded the four machines and kept the looms oiled and clean. They were assisted by 'little tenters', children on a fixed wage who ran errands and did small tasks. They learnt the job of the weaver by watching. Often they would be half timers, carrying a green card which teacher and overlookers would sign to say they had turned up at the mill in the morning and the afternoon at the school. At fourteen or so they come full-time into the mill, and started by sharing looms with an experienced worker where it was important to learn quickly as they would both be on piece work. Serious problems with the loom were left to the tackler to sort out. He would inevitably be a man, as were usually the overlookers. The mill had its health and safety issues, there was a reason why the women tied their hair back with scarves. Inhaling cotton dust caused lung problems, and the noise was causing total hearing loss. Weavers would mee-maw as normal conversation was impossible. Weavers used to 'kiss the shuttle', that is, suck thread through the eye of the shuttle. This left a foul taste in the mouth due to the oil, which was also carcinogenic.

=== Craft weavers ===
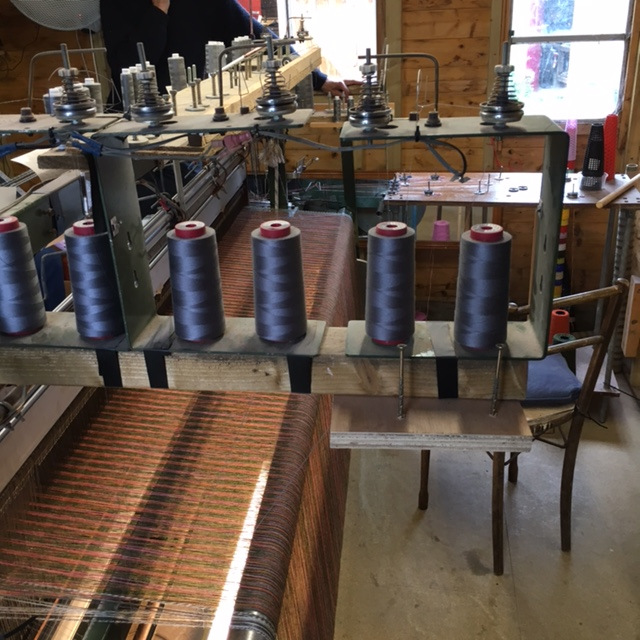
Pedal-powered loom used by Skye Weavers, Isle of Skye, Scotland

Arts and Crafts was an international design philosophy that originated in England and flourished between 1860 and 1910 (especially the second half of that period), continuing its influence until the 1930s. Instigated by the artist and writer William Morris (1834–1896) during the 1860s and inspired by the writings of John Ruskin (1819–1900), it had its earliest and most complete development in the British Isles but spread to Europe and North America. It was largely a reaction against mechanisation and the philosophy advocated of traditional craftsmanship using simple forms and often medieval, romantic or folk styles of decoration. Handweaving was highly regarded and taken up as a decorative art.

== Indigenous cultures ==
=== Navajo Culture ===
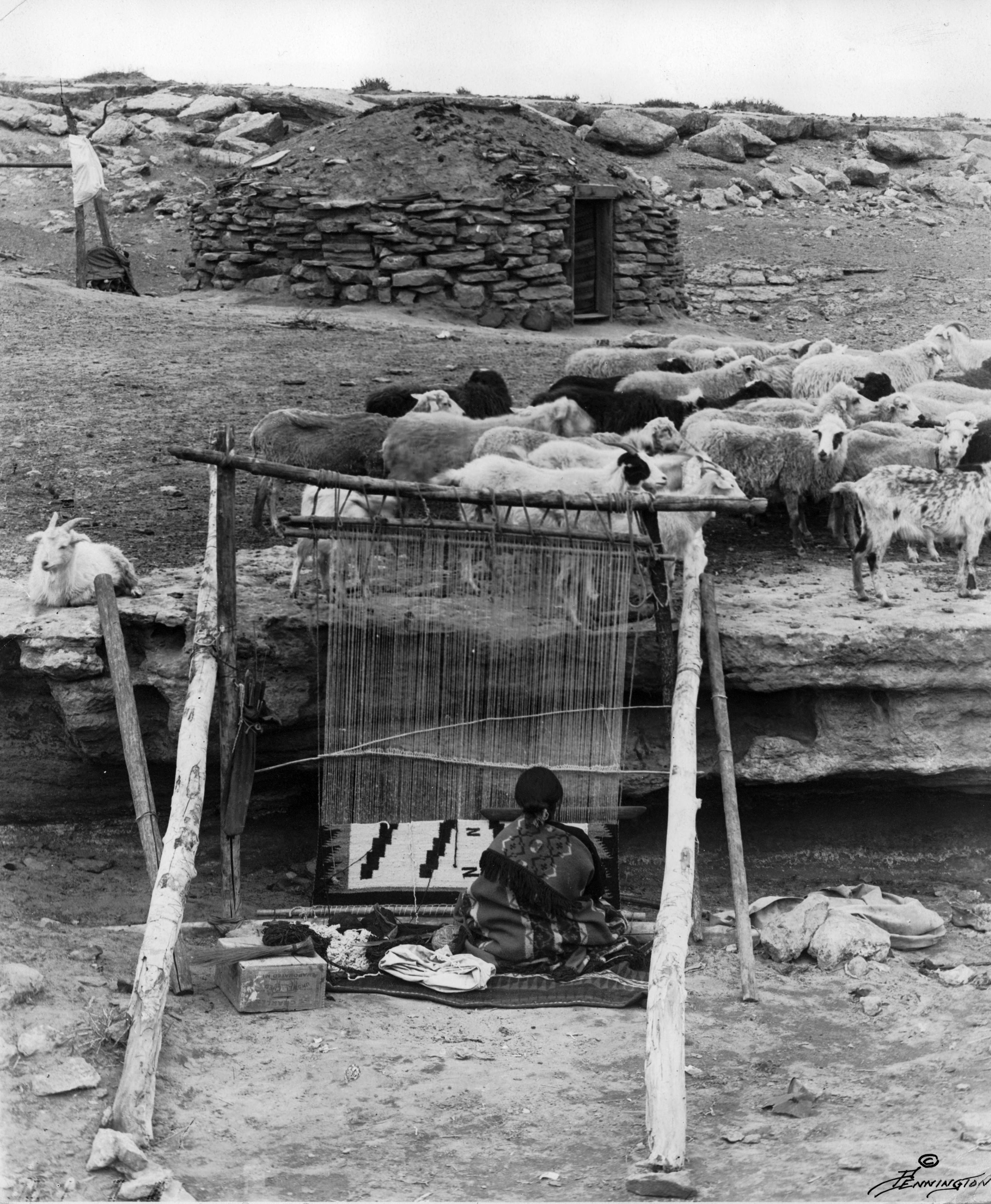
Weaving of a traditional Navajo rug

Textile weaving, using cotton dyed with pigments, was a dominant craft among pre-colonization tribes of the American southwest, including various Pueblo peoples, the Zuni, and the Ute tribes. The first Spaniards to visit the region wrote about seeing Navajo blankets. With the introduction of Navajo-Churro sheep, the resulting woolen products have become very well known. By the 18th century the Navajo had begun to import yarn with their favorite color, Bayeta red. Using an upright loom, the Navajo wove blankets worn as garments and then rugs after the 1880s for trade. Navajo traded for commercial wool, such as Germantown, imported from Pennsylvania. Under the influence of European-American settlers at trading posts, Navajos created new and distinct styles, including "Two Gray Hills" (predominantly black and white, with traditional patterns), "Teec Nos Pos" (colorful, with very extensive patterns), "Ganado" (founded by Don Lorenzo Hubbell), red dominated patterns with black and white, "Crystal" (founded by J. B. Moore), "Oriental" and Persian styles (almost always with natural dyes), "Wide Ruins", "Chinlee", banded geometric patterns, "Klagetoh", diamond type patterns, "Red Mesa" and bold diamond patterns. Many of these patterns exhibit a fourfold symmetry, which is thought to embody traditional ideas about harmony, or hózhó.

=== Amazon cultures ===
Among the indigenous people of the Amazon basin densely woven palm-bast mosquito netting, or tents, were utilized by the Panoans, Tupinambá, Western Tucano, Yameo, Záparoans, and perhaps by the indigenous peoples of the central Huallaga River basin (Steward 1963:520). Aguaje palm-bast (Mauritia flexuosa, Mauritia minor, or swamp palm) and the frond spears of the Chambira palm (Astrocaryum chambira, A. munbaca, A. tucuma, also known as Cumare or Tucum) have been used for centuries by the Urarina of the Peruvian Amazon to make cordage, net-bags hammocks, and to weave fabric. Among the Urarina, the production of woven palm-fiber goods is imbued with varying degrees of an aesthetic attitude, which draws its authentication from referencing the Urarina's primordial past. Urarina mythology attests to the centrality of weaving and its role in engendering Urarina society. The post-diluvial creation myth accords women's weaving knowledge a pivotal role in Urarina social reproduction. Even though palm-fiber cloth is regularly removed from circulation through mortuary rites, Urarina palm-fiber wealth is neither completely inalienable, nor fungible since it is a fundamental medium for the expression of labor and exchange. The circulation of palm-fiber wealth stabilizes a host of social relationships, ranging from marriage and fictive kinship (compadrazco, spiritual compeership) to perpetuating relationships with the deceased.

== Computer science ==
The Nvidia Parallel Thread Execution ISA derives some terminology (specifically the term Warp to refer to a group of concurrent processing threads) from historical weaving traditions.

== Gender politics ==
=== Women's work ===
Weaving is a practice that is typically considered to be "women's work", either part of their employment, cultural practices, or leisure. The categorization of weaving as women's work has bled into many fields, from art history, anthropology, sociology, and even psychology. While claiming that women had not contributed much to civilization's history, Sigmund Freud wrote that "one technique which they may have invented [is] that of plaiting and weaving."

Women's work is often not recorded as a central activity to building Western history and culture. Yet, some anthropologists argue that textile production facilitated societal establishment and growth, therefore women were integral to perpetuating communities. To record their stories, beliefs, and symbols important to their culture, women engaged in weaving, embroidering, or other fiber practices. These practices have existed for centuries documented through art history, myth, and oral history and are still practiced today.

=== Reception in the mainstream art world ===
Weaving is often classified as "craft" alongside other art forms like ceramics, embroidery, basket weaving, and more. Historically, there has been a hierarchy between artists who were considered "craftspeople" and artists who worked in traditional mediums of painting and sculpture. The traditional artists wanted to keep artisans in the minority, so there was little reception for arts that were considered craft.

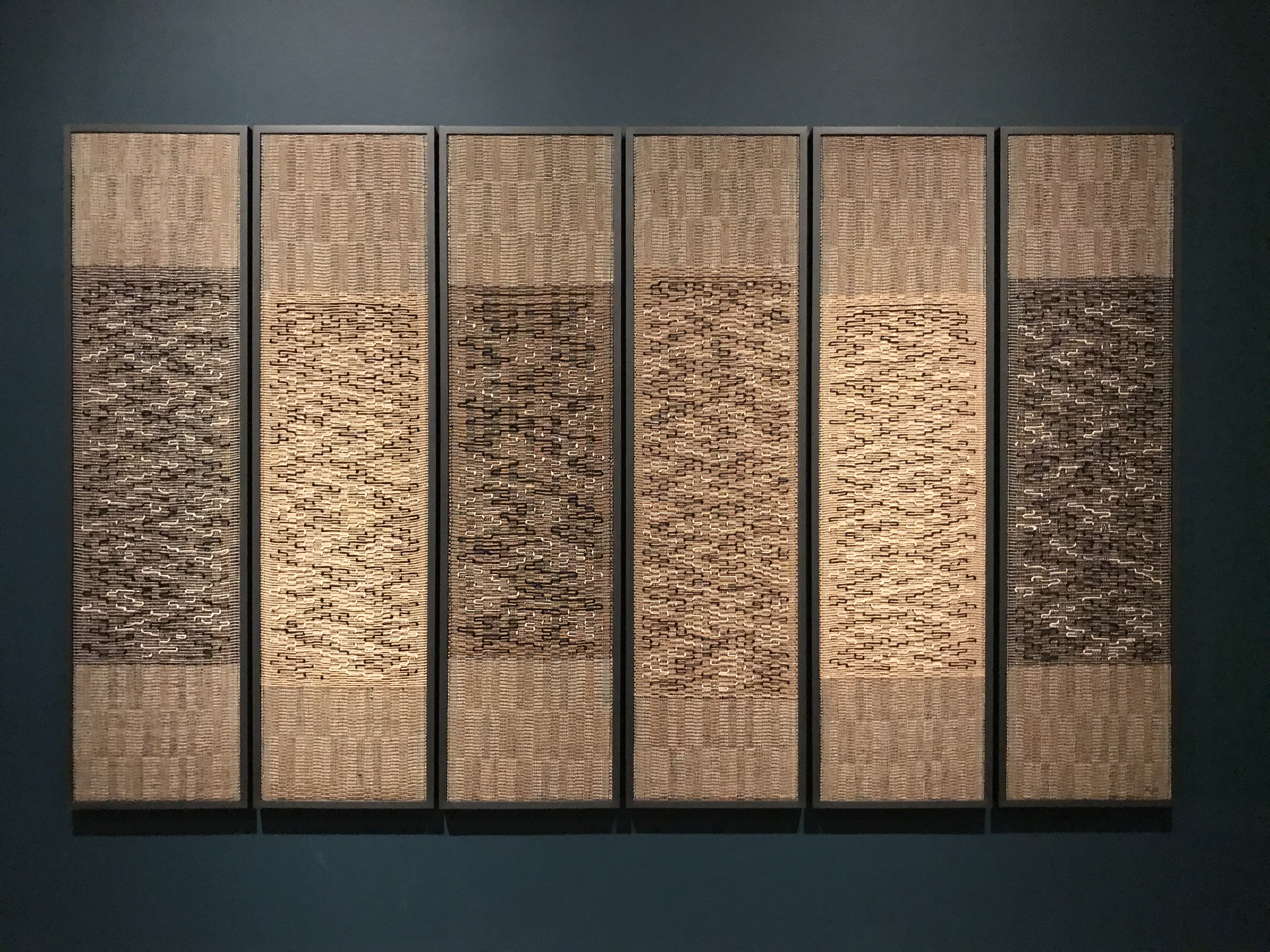
Photo of weavings exhibited in Anni Albers' retrospective at Tate Modern in 2018

In 1939, art critic Clement Greenberg wrote "Avant-Garde and Kitsch" where he presented his ideas about "high" and "low" art. His definition of "low" art was likely informed by years of theory against decoration and ornamentation, which was correlated with femininity in the early 1900s by critics like Adolf Loos and Karl Scheffler. Although Greenberg never explicitly says the word "craft", many scholars postulate that this is one of the origins of Western opposition to weaving, and more largely art that is considered craft.

Only recently has the art world begun to recognize weaving as an art form and to exhibit woven articles as art objects. Exhibitions of large scope have been organized to affirm the importance of textiles in the art historical canon, such as the Museum of Contemporary Art, Los Angeles' With Pleasure: Pattern and Decoration in American Art 1972–1985. Women weavers, like Anni Albers, Lenore Tawney, Magdalena Abakanowicz, Olga de Amaral, and Sheila Hicks, are now the subject of exhibitions and major retrospectives across the world.

== See also ==
- Textile
- Fiber
- Textile arts
- Fiber art
- Craft
- Basket weaving
- Persian weave
- Petate
- Textile manufacturing terminology
- Weaving (mythology)

== Bibliography ==
- Backer, Patricia (10 June 2005). Technology in the Middle Ages, History of Technology. Technology and Civilization (Tech 198). San Jose, California, USA: San Jose State University. Archived from the original on 4 March 2015.
- Bellerby, Rachel (2005). Chasing the Sixpence: The lives of Bradford Mill Folk. Ayr: Fort Publishing Ltd. ISBN 0-9547431-8-0.
- Collier, Ann M (1974), A Handbook of Textiles, Pergamon Press, p. 258, ISBN 0-08-018057-4
- Dooley, William H. (1914). Textiles (Project Gutenberg ed.). Boston, USA: D.C. Heath and Co.
- Feng, Menglong (November 2001). "Stories Old and New. By Feng Menglong, translated by Shuhui Yang and Yunqin Yang. pp. 794, 10 illus. from the 1620 edition. Seattle, University of Washington Press, 2000". Journal of the Royal Asiatic Society. 11 (3): 407–409. doi:10.1017/s1356186301380343. ISSN 1356-1863. S2CID 162905651.
- Freethy, Ron (2005). Memories of the Lancashire Cotton Mills. Aspects of Local History. Newbury, Berkshire: Countryside Books. ISBN 978-1-84674-104-3.
- Guest, Richard (1823). A compendious history of the cotton-manufacture. Manchester: Author, Printed by Joseph Pratt, Chapel Walks.
- Li, Lillian M. (1981). China's silk trade: traditional industry in the modern world, 1842–1937. Vol. 97 (1st ed.). Cambridge, Mass.: Council on East Asian Studies, Harvard University. doi:10.2307/j.ctt1tfjb18. ISBN 978-0-674-11962-8. JSTOR j.ctt1tfjb18. OCLC 576853423.
- Timmins, Geoffrey (1993). The last shift: the decline of handloom weaving in nineteenth-century Lancashire. Manchester University Press ND. ISBN 0-7190-3725-5.
- This article incorporates text from Textiles by William H. Dooley, Boston, D.C. Heath and Co., 1914, a volume in the public domain and available online from Project Gutenberg
