= Pibiones =

Weaving technique

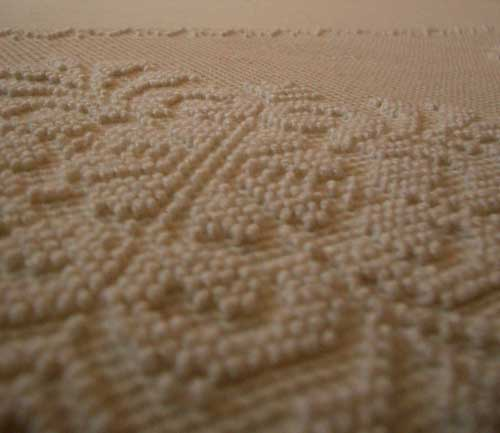
Pibiones fabric

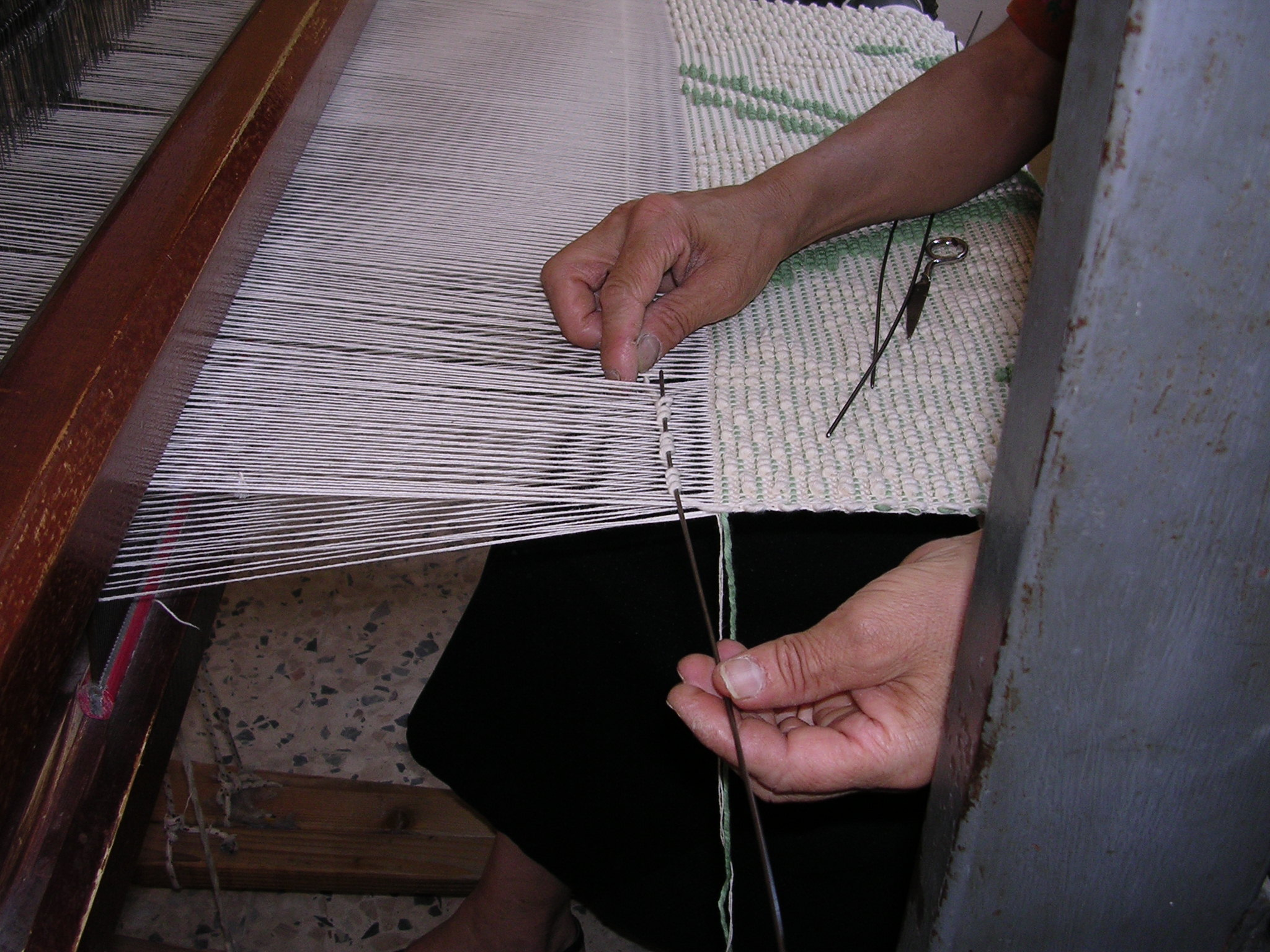
Sardinian craftswoman

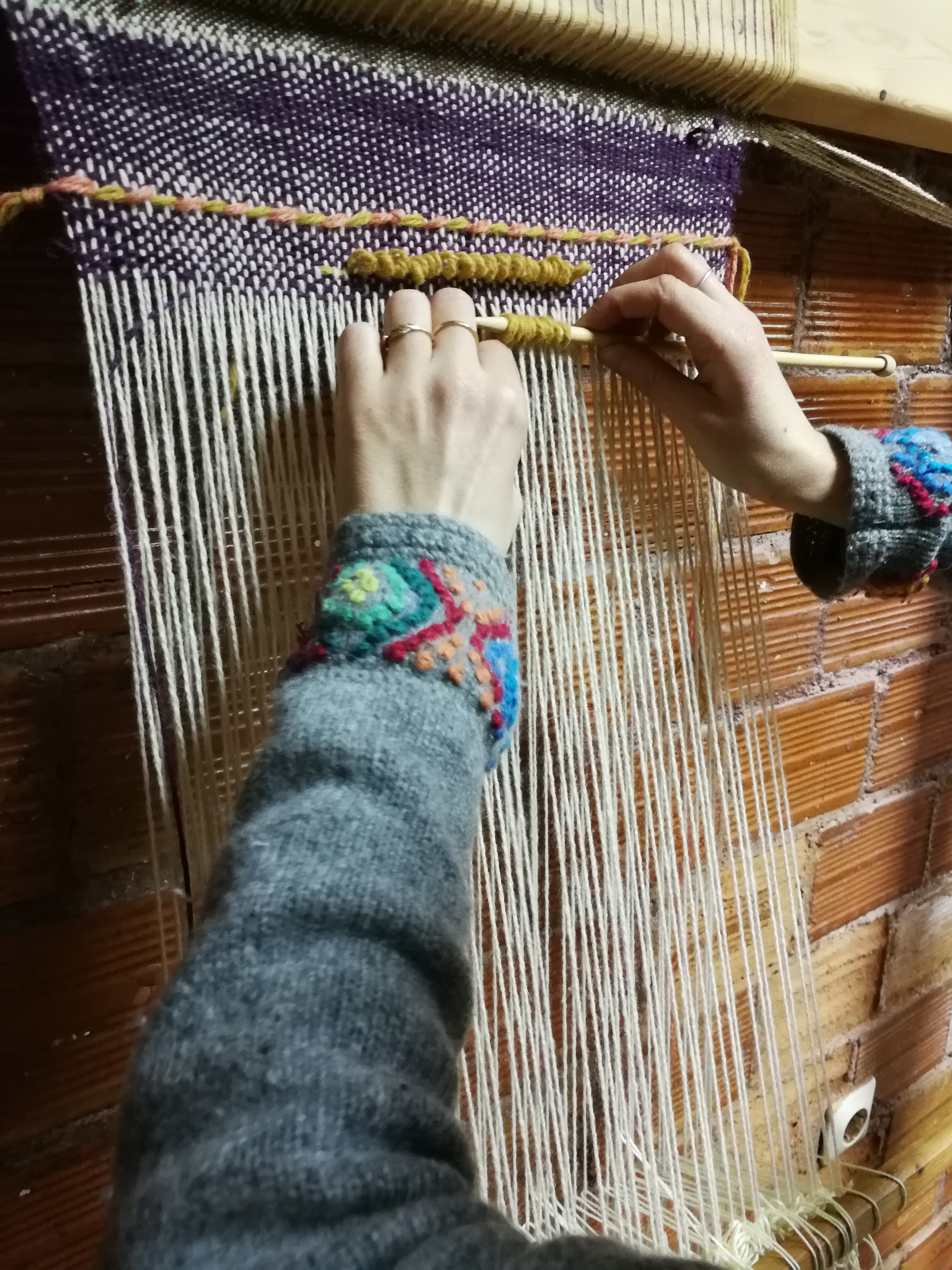
A larger-scale looped-pile weft on a vertical loom, using a knitting needle, for clarity.

The pibiones or grain weaving technique is most commonly found in the central and eastern areas of Sardinia, Italy. This is a particular type of stitched relief, where the pattern is formed from the countless grains incorporated into the cloth during weaving. These are made by twisting the weft yarn around a needle which is arranged in a horizontal position on the loom; after the thread is beat into place, the needle is then pulled away, leaving behind a raised effect (grains).

Pibiones are used to decorate traditional Sardinian linen bedcovers, historically woven by young Sardinian girls to be included in their dowry (corredo).

The pibiones technique was used in antiquity only for the best hand-woven bedcovers sa faona and for household articles such as curtains, fabrics, cushions, and tablecloths.
