= Seraband rug =

Iranian handwoven floor rug

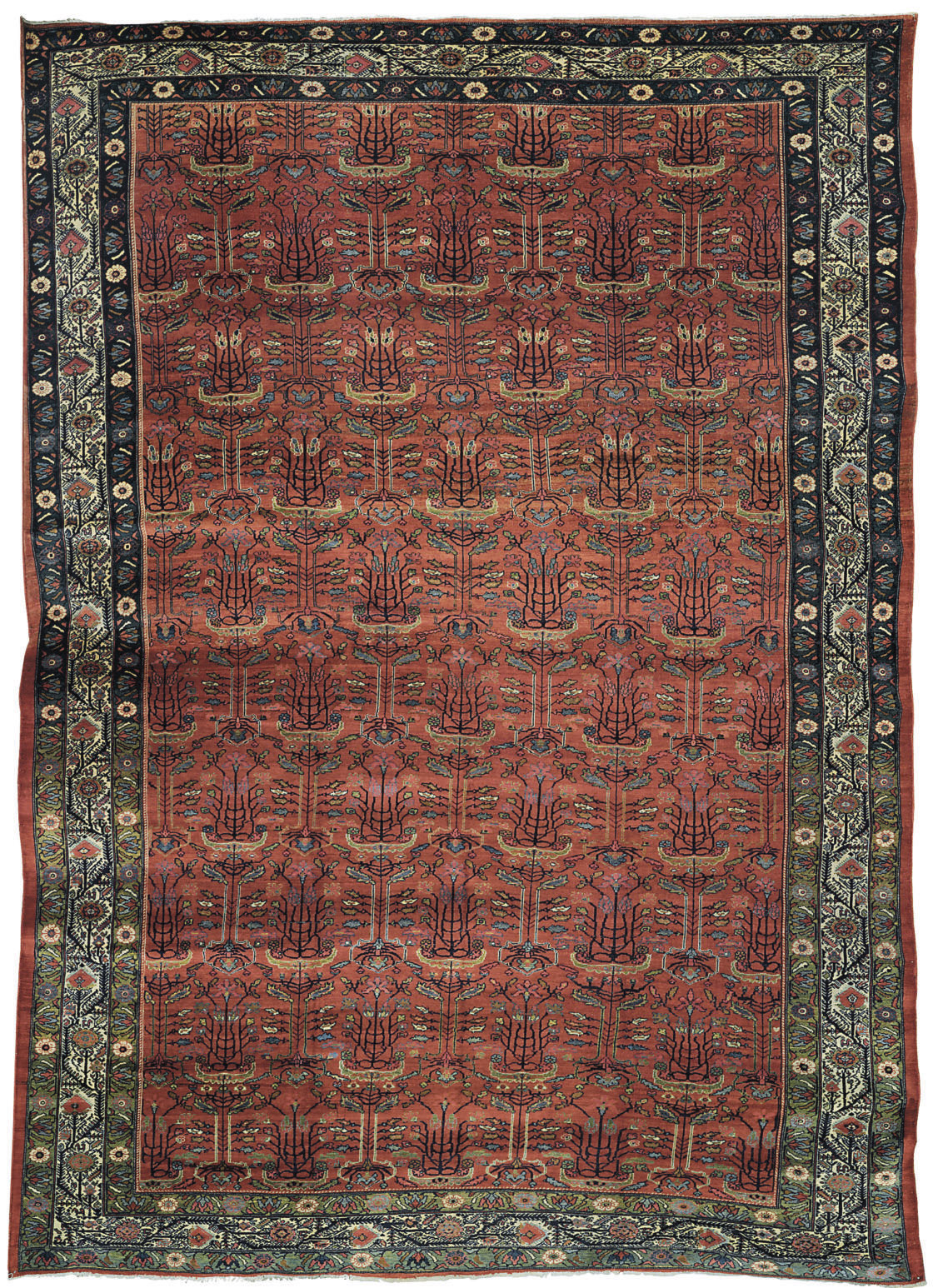
Serabend carpet

Seraband rug or Saraband, is an Iranian (Persian) handwoven floor rug from the Ser-e Band district (located southwest of Arak, Iran). These 19th-century and early-20th-century rugs have a "mir" design, characterized by small, pear or leaf forms in diagonal rows.
